= Athanasius I Gammolo =

42nd Patriarch of Syriac Orthodox Church of Antioch (600 - 641)

- Syriac Orthodox Patriarch of Antioch and All the East
- Church: Syriac Orthodox Church
- See: Antioch
- Installed: 594/595 or 603
- Term ended: 631
- Predecessor: Julian II
- Successor: John III

Personal details
- Born: Samosata, Eastern Roman Empire (modern-day Samsat, Adıyaman, Turkey)
- Died: 28 July 631
- Residence: Monastery of Saint Zacchaeus, Raqqa

Sainthood
- Feast day: 3 January
- Venerated in: Syriac Orthodox Church

Athanasius I Gammolo (Syriac: ܐܬܢܐܣܝܘܣ ܩܕܡܝܐ ܓܡܠܐ) was the Patriarch of Antioch and head of the Syriac Orthodox Church from 594/595 or 603 until his death in 631. He is commemorated as a saint by the Syriac Orthodox Church in the Martyrology of Rabban Sliba, and his feast day is 3 January.

== Biography ==
=== Early life ===
Athanasius was born into a wealthy family in the 6th century at Samosata, and was raised with his brother Severus under the care of their mother Joanna, after their father had died. According to Athanasius' biography of Patriarch Severus of Antioch, Athanasius' father had been a priest and friend of the patriarch, and his grandfather named Athanasius was also a priest and friend to the patriarch's grandfather Severus. The historicity of this assertion is doubtful, however, as Patriarch Severus' writings suggest he was a pagan convert from a pagan family, and thus it is likely this represents an attempt to Christianise his ancestry. Athanasius' mother donated most of her husband's money to the poor, but kept enough to provide for Athanasius and Severus. The two brothers received a good education, and later became monks at the Monastery of Qenneshre, where they were trained in the recitation of the Bible.

After the death of Patriarch Julian II, a synod was held at a monastery near Qenneshre to elect his successor, and the bishops confined themselves, and fasted and prayed for three days. On the evening of the third day, it was revealed to the bishops that the monk that they would see passing by the monastery in the early morning of the next day was chosen by the Holy Spirit to be the next patriarch. The bishops saw Athanasius driving a camel by the monastery in the following morning, and after testing his knowledge and discovering he was a monk at Qenneshre, he was taken against his will and elected as patriarch. He agreed to become patriarch, but his assumption of the office was delayed for a year as the bishops agreed to his request that he be allowed to return to Qenneshre to complete his duty to bring salt from the salt mine at Gabbula to the monastery. This led him to become known as Gammolo ("camel driver" in Syriac). Sources disagree on the date of Athanasius' consecration as patriarch. It is placed on 6 November 603 by the Chronicle of Thomas the Presbyter, and is supported by Jacob of Edessa, whereas Michael the Syrian dates the consecration to 594. It is likely that Michael or his source removed the vacancy between the death of Julian II and the consecration of Athanasius so to not cast doubt on the legitimacy of the patriarchal succession.

=== Patriarch of Antioch ===
In 610 or 616/617, Athanasius and five bishops travelled to Alexandria in Egypt after receiving a letter from the Coptic Pope Anastasius of Alexandria written in the hope of restoring relations. The Syriac and Coptic churches, although both non-Chalcedonian, had been in schism as a consequence of the dispute over the issue of tritheism between Patriarch Peter III and Pope Damian of Alexandria in the late 6th century. Athanasius and his companions, including the bishops Paul of Edessa, Paul of Tella, and Thomas of Mabbogh, met with Anastasius at a monastery near Alexandria, as non-Chalcedonians were forbidden from entering the city, and discussions were held to end the schism. Under the auspices of Nicetas, governor of Egypt, Paul of Tella and Thomas of Mabbogh represented Athanasius in discussions with the Coptic representatives, and eventually an agreement was reached and the schism between the churches was ended. A joint declaration by Athanasius and Anastasius was issued, condemning the Council of Chalcedon and Leo's Tome. Afterwards, the delegation remained at the monastery for another month before returning to Syria.

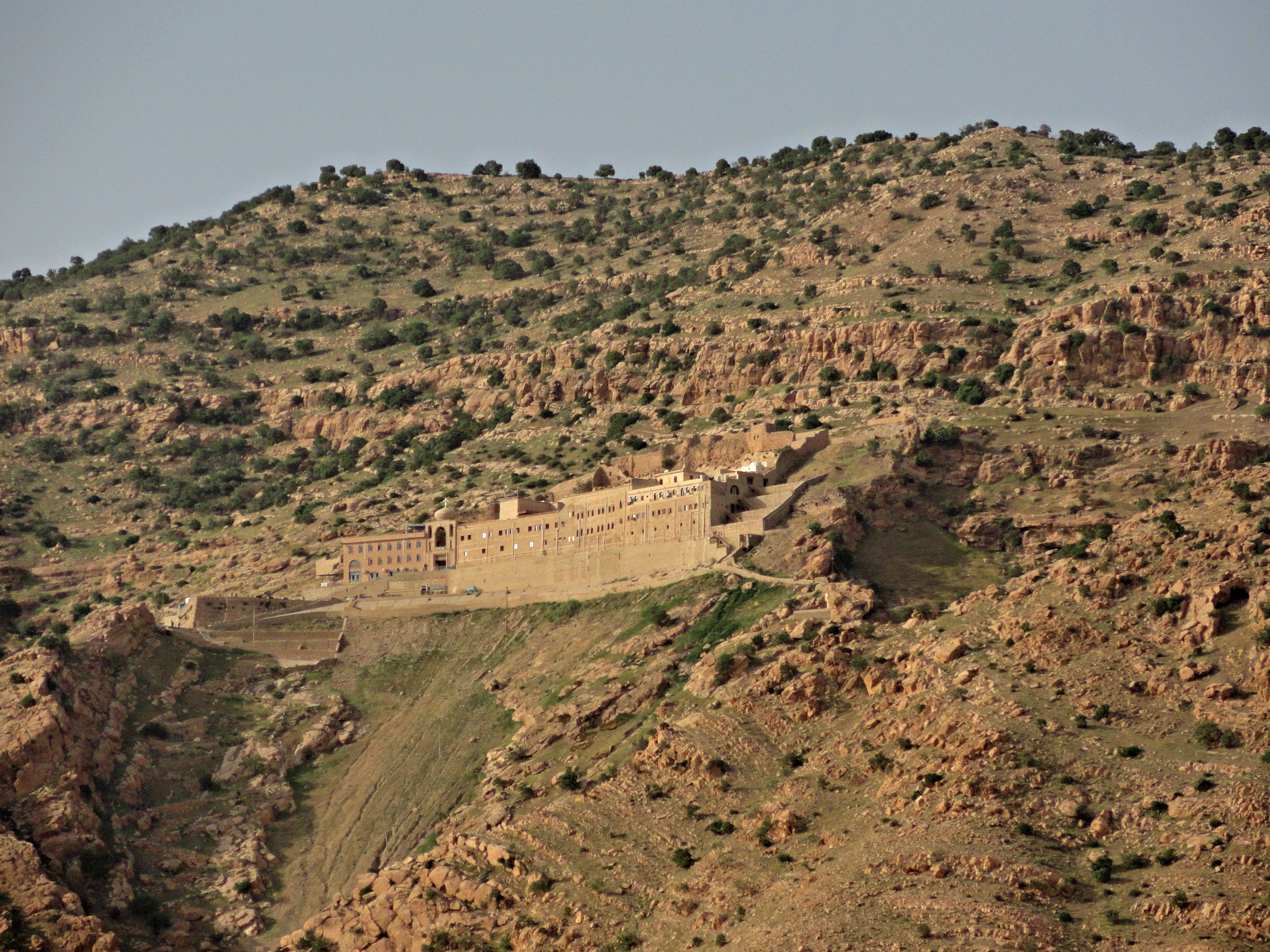
The Monastery of Saint Matthew.

At the conclusion of the Roman-Sasanian war of 602–628, Athanasius sent his syncellus (secretary) John to Shahanshah Ardashir III of the Sasanian Empire, and gave him instructions to afterwards travel to the Monastery of Saint Matthew near Nineveh in Assyria to re-establish the union between the Syriac non-Chalcedonians in the Roman and Sasanian empires. After a synod had been held at the monastery and concluded in favour of the restoration of the union, John returned to Athanasius with the bishops Christopher of the Monastery of Saint Matthew, George of Sinjar, Daniel of Banuhadra, Gregory of Baremman, and Yardafne of Shahrzoul, and the monks Marutha, Ith Alaha, and Aha, who were to be ordained bishops to fill vacant dioceses. Athanasius authorised the eastern non-Chalcedonians to ordain their own bishops, and Christopher consecrated the three monks as bishops, and the patriarch then raised Marutha to metropolitan bishop of Tagrit, with primacy over all bishops in the Sasanian Empire. The eastern delegation returned home, and Athanasius issued a letter to the Monastery of Saint Matthew in 629, confirming its primacy over the monasteries in the Sasanian Empire, and its resident bishop was granted the titles chorepiscopus and 'head of the abbots', and raised to metropolitan bishop of the bishops of Assyria.

=== Later life ===
According to the Chronicle of Michael the Syrian, the Emperor Heraclius summoned Athanasius to Mabbogh in Syria in 629 to resolve the schism between the Chalcedonian Imperial Church and the non-Chalcedonian Syriac Orthodox Church. Athanasius and the bishops Thomas of Palmyra, Basil of Emesa, Sergius of ‘Urd, John of Cyrrhus, Thomas of Mabbogh, Daniel of Harrin, Isaiah of Edessa, Severus of Qenneshre, Athanasius of Arabissus, Cosmas of Epiphania, and Severus of Samosata met with the emperor and debated for twelve days. Heraclius demanded they accept a Chalcedonian creed containing the doctrines of monothelitism and monoenergism, but this was rejected, and the emperor became enraged and ordered the persecution of non-Chalcedonians within the empire. On the other hand, the Chronicle of Theophanes purports that Athanasius agreed to accept the Chalcedonian creed so to become recognised by the emperor as the patriarch of Antioch, as there had not been a Chalcedonian patriarch since the death of Anastasius II in 608.

Athanasius died on 28 July 631, and was buried at the Monastery of the Garoumaye.

== Works ==
The Syro-Hexapla, the Syriac translation of the Old Testament, was written by Paul of Tella on commission from Athanasius in 615–617. Athanasius may have also been the patron of Paul of Edessa's Syriac translation of the Homilies of Gregory of Nazianzus, as well as the Harklean version of the New Testament by Thomas of Mabbogh.

Athanasius wrote a biography of Patriarch Severus of Antioch. The original copy, likely written in Greek or Syriac, has been lost, but Coptic fragments survive, as well as an Arabic copy that was later translated into Ethiopic.

== Bibliography ==
- Atiya, Aziz Suryal (1991). "Anastasius". Coptic Encyclopedia. Macmillan.
- Barsoum, Ephrem (2003). The Scattered Pearls: A History of Syriac Literature and Sciences. Translated by Matti Moosa (2nd ed.). Gorgias Press.
- Booth, Phil (2013). Crisis of Empire: Doctrine and Dissent at the End of Late Antiquity. University of California Press.
- Fiey, Jean Maurice (2004). Lawrence Conrad (ed.). Saints Syriaques. The Darwin Press.
- Ignatius Jacob III (2008). History of the Monastery of Saint Matthew in Mosul. Translated by Matti Moosa. Gorgias Press.
- Palmer, Andrew (1990). Monk and Mason on the Tigris Frontier: The Early History of Tur Abdin. Cambridge University Press.
- Palmer, Andrew (1993). The Seventh Century in the West Syrian Chronicles. Liverpool University Press.
- Tannous, Jack B. (2011). "Athanasios I Gamolo". In Sebastian P. Brock; Aaron M. Butts; George A. Kiraz; Lucas Van Rompay (eds.). Gorgias Encyclopedic Dictionary of the Syriac Heritage: Electronic Edition.
- Tannous, Jack B. (2018). The Making of the Medieval Middle East: Religion, Society, and Simple Believers. Princeton University Press.
- Tomass, Mark (2016). The Religious Roots of the Syrian Conflict: The Remaking of the Fertile Crescent. Springer.
- Youssef, Youhanna Nessim (2019). "Severus of Antioch". In Ken Parry (ed.). The Wiley Blackwell Companion to Patristics. John Wiley & Sons. pp. 226–237.

| Preceded by Julian II | Syriac Orthodox Patriarch of Antioch; 594/595/603–631 | Succeeded by John III |
