= Philoxenus of Mabbug =

Syriac saint, theologian and writer (died 523)

Saint Philoxenus of Mabbug ܐܟܣܢܝܐ ܡܒܘܓܝܐ
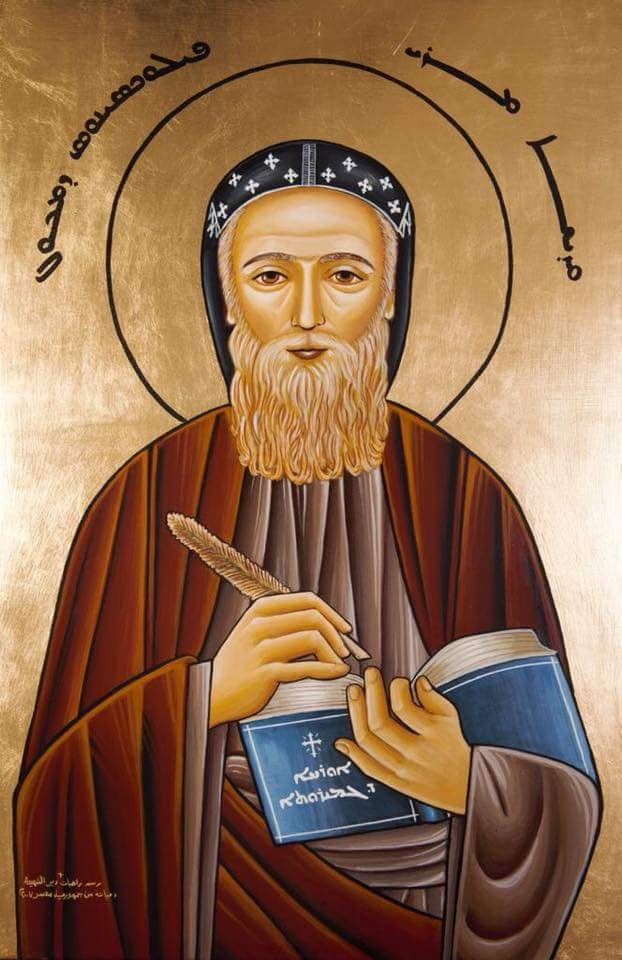
- Syriac Orthodox Icon of Saint Philoxenus of Mabbug

Bishop of Mabbug, Teacher of the Church
- Died: 523; Philippopolis (Thrace), Thrace, Roman Empire
- Venerated in: Oriental Orthodox Churches
- Feast: 10 December (Syriac Orthodox Church)
- Attributes: writing commentaries and treaties; scholar, writer, and defender of the faith

Philoxenus of Mabbug (Syriac: ܐܟܣܢܝܐ ܡܒܘܓܝܐ, Aksenāyâ Mabûḡāyâ; died 523), also known as Philoxenus of Hierapolis, Xenaias, and Akhsenaya, was one of the most notable Syriac prose writers during the Byzantine period and a vehement champion of Miaphysitism.

== Life ==
Philoxenus was born between 440 and 455 in the village of Tahal, in the district of Beth Garmaï east of the Tigris, modern-day Iraq. Though a he was a subject of Persia by birth, all of his known public life was spent within the Byzantine Empire. His family originated from Ecbatana in Media, and he had at least two siblings, including a brother named Addai who was a teacher at the School of Edessa. The claims that he had been a slave and was never baptized seem to be malicious fabrications by his theological opponents after his death.

His birth name was Akhsnoyo (Syriac: ܐܟܣܢܝܐ), which means stranger, rendered in Greek as Xenias. Upon his consecration as bishop by Patriarch Peter II (Peter the Fuller) of Mabbug, his name was changed to the Greek Philoxenus ("lover of strangers").

He was educated at Edessa, possibly at the famous "School of the Persians", which was eventually expelled from the city in 489 due to its connections with Nestorianism. During his studies, rivalry at the school was fierce between the Theodorian and Cyrillian theological factions. Although trained in the East Syriac rite, Philoxenus later introduced elements of this tradition into the West Syriac rite. His anaphora shows a connection to the ancient liturgy of Addai and Mari.

=== Episcopate ===
After leaving Edessa, Philoxenus moved to Antioch, where he openly supported Miaphysitism and the Henotikon. He was expelled by Calandio, the Chalcedonian patriarch of Antioch, for this doctrinal difference. In 485, Peter the Fuller, the non-Chalcedonian patriarch, consecrated him bishop of Mabbug (Hierapolis). At that time, the city was still a flourishing pagan centre dedicated to the fertility goddess Atargatis.

Philoxenus played a leading role in church politics. In 512, he had a hand in the deposition of the Chalcedonian patriarch Flavian II of Antioch and in the installation of Severus of Antioch. He also participated in the Synod of Tyre (513–515) presided over jointly with Severus, where the Henotikon was upheld and Chalcedon was anathematised as heretical.

Following the ascention of Emperor Justin I in 519, a harsh crackdown on Miaphysites began throughout the empire. Philoxenus was arrested and exiled to Philippopolis in Thrace, where he died, martyred by suffocation of smoke on 10 December 523.

== Background ==
The years which followed the Council of Chalcedon (451) were a stormy period in the Syriac Church. Philoxenus soon attracted notice by his strenuous advocacy of Miaphysitism.

When Calandio, the Chalcedonian patriarch of Antioch, was expelled by the Miaphysite Peter the Fuller in 485, Philoxenus was ordained bishop of Mabbug. It was probably during the earlier years of his episcopate that Philoxenus composed his thirteen homilies on the Christian life.

== Syriac Bible ==
Later he devoted himself to the revision of the Syriac versions of the Bible, and with the help of his chorbishop Polycarp produced in 508 the so-called Philoxenian version, which was in some sense the received Bible of the Syriac Miaphysites during the 6th century. In the meantime he continued his ecclesiastical activity, working as a bitter opponent of Flavian II of Antioch, who was patriarch of Antioch from 498 to 512 and accepted the decrees of the Council of Chalcedon.

With the support of Emperor Anastasius I Dicorus, the Miaphysites ousted Flavian II in 512 and replaced him with their partisan Severus of Antioch. Of Philoxenus's part in the struggle we possess not too trustworthy accounts by hostile writers, such as Theophanes the Confessor and Theodorus Lector. We know that in 498 he was staying at Edessa; in or about 507, according to Theophanes, he was summoned by the emperor to Constantinople; and he finally presided at a synod at Sidon which was the means of procuring the replacement of Flavian by Severus. But the triumph was short-lived. Justin I, who succeeded Anastasius in 518 and adhered to the Chalcedonian creed, exiled Severus and Philoxenus in 519. Philoxenus was banished to Philippopolis in Thrace, and afterwards to Gangra in Paphlagonia, where he was murdered in 523.

== Writings ==
Apart from his redoubtable powers as a controversialist, Philoxenus is remembered as a scholar, an elegant writer, and an exponent of practical Christianity. Of the chief monument of his scholarship – the Philoxenian version of the Bible – only the Gospels and certain portions of Isaiah are known to survive (see William Wright, Syr. Lit., 14). It was an attempt to provide a more accurate rendering of the Septuagint than had hitherto existed in Syriac and obtained recognition among Syriac Miaphysites until superseded by the still more literal renderings of the Old Testament by Paul of Tella and of the New Testament by Thomas of Harkel (both in 616–617), of which the latter at least was based on the work of Philoxenus.

There are also extant portions of commentaries on the Gospels from his pen. Of the excellence of his style and of his practical religious zeal we are able to judge from the thirteen homilies on the Christian life and character which have been edited and translated by E. A. Wallis Budge (London, 1894). In these he holds aloof for the most part from theological controversy, and treats in an admirable tone and spirit the themes of faith, simplicity, the fear of God, poverty, greed, abstinence and unchastity. His affinity with his earlier countryman Aphrahat is manifest both in his choice of subjects and his manner of treatment. As his quotations from Scripture appear to be made from the Peshitta, he probably wrote the homilies before he embarked upon the Philoxenian version. Philoxenus wrote also many controversial works and some liturgical pieces. Many of his letters survive, and at least two have been edited. Several of his writings were translated into Arabic and Ethiopic.

== Themes ==
Philoxenus was a prolific writer whose works continue to influence Christian thought. For him, theology was not merely an intellectual pursuit but the essential path to divine knowledge. He regarded the struggle against heresy as no less important than the struggle against sin and saw it as a central aspect of asceticism.

== Legacy and veneration ==
Philoxenus of Mabbug is considered a champion of Miaphysitism and one of the most venerated saints in the Oriental Orthodox tradition. He is celebrated as a master of theology, poetry, and the sciences, and a significant contributor to the golden age of Syriac culture. The Syriac Heritage Project describes him as "a master of eloquence and a distinguished philologist. An outstanding person in intelligence, knowledge and deeds, he was also abstinent and God-fearing. His style was stately and lucid. He masterfully portrayed good manners and sublime Christian virtues, producing a book on the perfect life which contains much benefit and is written in an infinitely beautiful style."

His feast day in the Syriac Orthodox Church and Malankara Orthodox Syrian Church is on December 10, and his relics are interred in Midyat in the Syriac Orthodox cultural region of Tur Abdin (modern-day Turkey), where his veneration remains strong.

== Bibliography ==
- Bondi, Roberta C. (1976). Three monophysite christologies: Severus of Antioch, Philoxenus of Mabbug and Jacob of Sarug. London: Oxford University Press. ISBN 978-0-19-826712-6.
- Michelson, David Allen (2014). The Practical Christology of Philoxenos of Mabbug. Oxford Early Christian Studies. Oxford: Oxford University Press. ISBN 978-0-19-872296-0.
- Rajan, K. Mani (2007). Martyrs, Saints & Prelates of The Syriac Orthodox Church (PDF). Vol. 1. The Travancore Syriac Orthodox Publishers.
- Dinno, Khalid S. (2017). The Syrian Orthodox Christians in the Late Ottoman Period and Beyond: Crisis, Then Revival. Gorgias Eastern Christian studies. Piscataway (N.J.): Gorgias Press, LLC. ISBN 978-1-4632-0575-1.
- Brock, Sebastian P. (1967). "Alphonse Mingana and the Letter of Philoxenus to Abu Afr" (PDF). Bulletin of the John Rylands Library. 50 (1): 199–206. doi:10.7227/BJRL.50.1.10.
- Meyendorff, John (1989). Imperial unity and Christian divisions: The Church 450–680 A.D. Crestwood, NY: Saint Vladimir's Seminary Press.
