= West Syriac Rite =

Eastern Christian liturgical rite

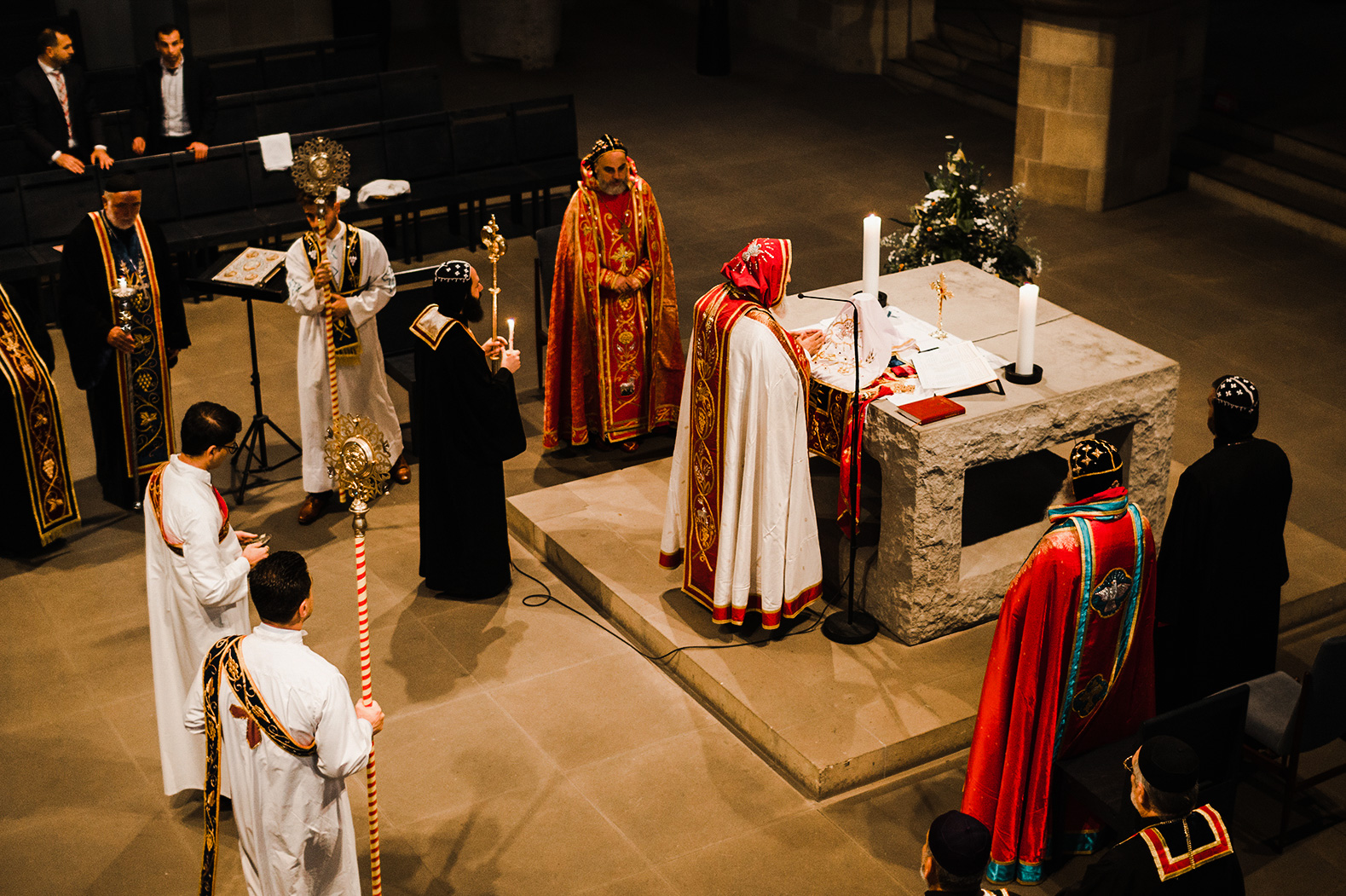
Celebration of the Holy Qurobo in the Syriac Orthodox Church led by Patriarch Ignatius Aphrem II

The West Syriac Rite, also called the Syriac-Antiochian Rite and the West Syrian Rite, is an Eastern Christian liturgical rite that employs the Divine Liturgy of Saint James in the West Syriac dialect. It is practiced in the Syriac Orthodox Church, the Syriac Catholic Church and the Malankara churches of India. The Maronite Church also uses the rite but in a very distinct way. It is one of two main liturgical rites of Syriac Christianity, the other being the East Syriac Rite. It originated in the ancient Patriarchate of Antioch. It has more anaphora than any other rite.

Although the West Syriac liturgical tradition had always included many texts translated from Greek, this new influx of materials of Greek origin led to the emergence of two slightly different Syriac Orthodox traditions, that of Antioch, incorporating these new elements, and that of Tikrit, which did not incorporate it. It was essentially the Tikrit rite that was introduced into South India in the 18th and 19th centuries.

== Usage ==
Versions of the West Syriac Rite are currently used by multiple different ecclesiastical bodies

- Eastern Catholic Churches in full communion with the Holy See of Rome:
  - Syriac Catholic Church based in Lebanon.
  - Maronite Church, sometimes identified with a particularly distinct use of the rite, based in Lebanon.
  - Malankara Syrian Catholic Church based in India.
- Oriental Orthodox Churches:
  - Syriac Orthodox Church of Antioch, based in Syria.
    - Jacobite Syrian Christian Church, an autonomous church based in India, in full communion with the Syriac Orthodox Patriarch of Antioch and other Oriental Orthodox churches.
  - Malankara Orthodox Syrian Church, based in India; an autocephalous Oriental Orthodox church.
- Independent Oriental Orthodox Church:
  - Malabar Independent Syrian Church of India. Independent Oriental Orthodox church not part of the Oriental Orthodox communion.
- Oriental Protestant Churches:
  - Malankara Mar Thoma Syrian Church (uses a Reformation variant of this rite omitting intercession to saints and prayers for departed. In full communion with the Anglican Communion and the Malabar Independent Syrian Church). It has peculiarities not found in the other churches.
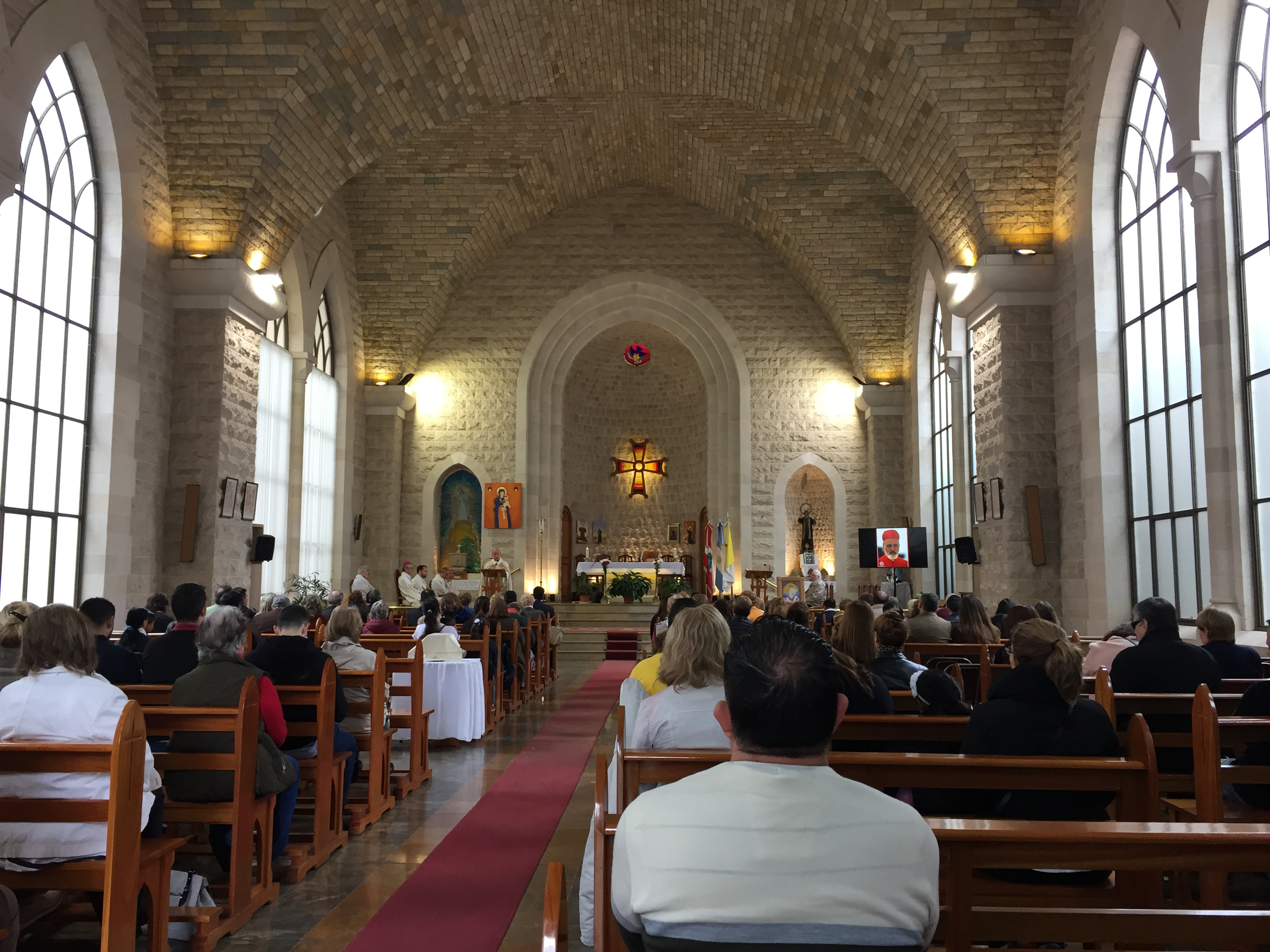
Holy Qurobo in the Maronite Church

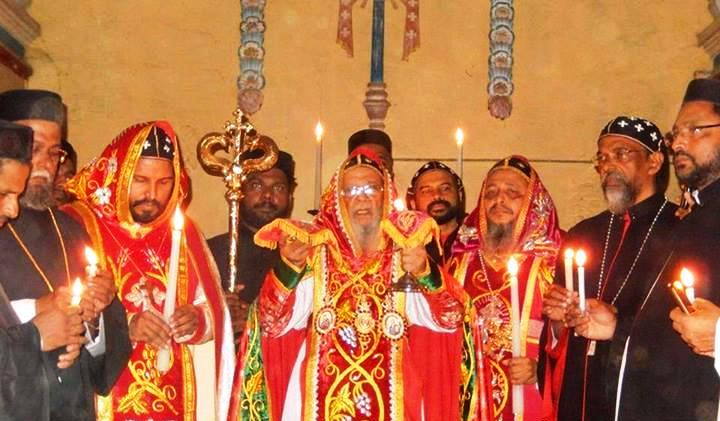
A West Syriac Rite Holy Qurbono of the Jacobite Syrian Christian Church holding paterissa (crozier)

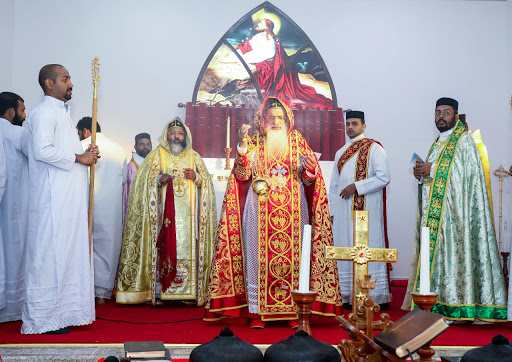
A West Syriac Rite Holy Qurbono of the Malankara Orthodox Syrian Church

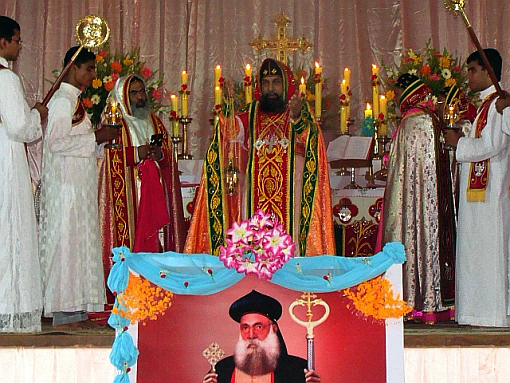
Holy Qurobo in the Syro-Malankara Catholic Church

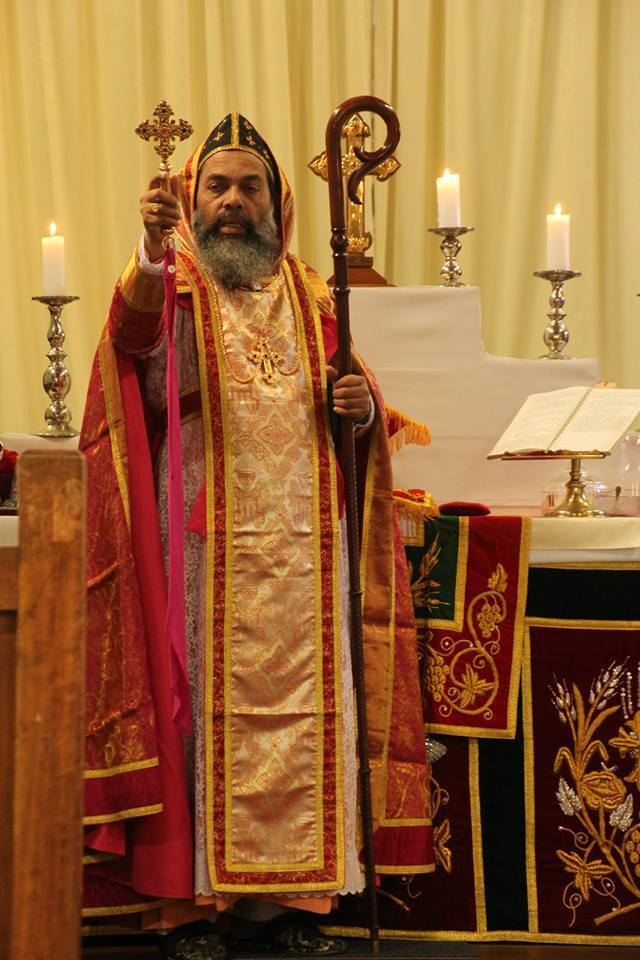
Holy Qurobo in Mar Thoma Syrian Church

== History ==
Lineages of the West Syriac Rite

The oldest known form of the Antiochene Rite is in Greek which is apparently its original language. The many Greek terms that remain in the Syriac form suggest that this is derived from Greek. The version must have been made early, evidently before the schism occasioned by the Council of Chalcedon, before the influence of Constantinople had begun. No doubt as soon as Christian communities arose in the rural areas of Roman Syria, the prayers which in the cities (Antioch, Jerusalem, etc.) were said in Greek, were, as a matter of course, translated into the local vernacular for the people's use.

Early sources, such as Peregrinatio Silviae describe the services at Jerusalem as being in Greek; but the lessons, first read in Greek, are then translated into Syriac. As long as all Western Syria was one communion, the country dioceses followed the rite of the patriarch at Antioch, only changing the language. Modifications adopted at Antioch in Greek were copied in Syriac by those who said their prayers in the national tongue. This point is important because the Syriac Liturgy (in its fundamental form) already contains all the changes brought to Antioch from Jerusalem. It is not the older pure Antiochene Rite, but the later Rite of Jerusalem-Antioch. The Liturgy of St. James, for example, prays first not for the Church of Antioch, but "for the holy Sion, the mother of all churches", that is, Jerusalem. (Brightman, pp. 89–90). The fact that both the Syriac and the Byzantine Orthodox Churches have the Jerusalem-Antiochene Liturgy is the chief proof that this had supplanted the older Antiochene use before the schism of the 5th century.

The earliest extant Syriac documents come from about the end of the 5th century. They contain valuable information about local forms of the Rite of Antioch-Jerusalem. The Syriac Orthodox Church kept a version of this rite which is obviously a local variant. Its

scheme and most of its prayers correspond to those of the Greek St. James; but it has amplifications and omissions such as is found in all local forms of early rites. It seems too that the Syriac Church made some modifications after the schism. This is certainly the case at one point, that of the Trisagion.

One Syriac writer is James of Edessa (d. 708), who wrote a letter to a priest Thomas comparing the Syriac Liturgy with that of Egypt. This letter is an exceedingly valuable and really critical discussion of the rite. A number of later Syriac writers followed James of Edessa. On the whole this church produced the first scientific students of liturgy. Benjamin of Edessa (period unknown), Lazarus bar Sabhetha of Baghdad (ninth century), Moses bar Kephas of Mosul (d. 903), Dionysius bar Salibi of Amida (d. 1171) wrote valuable commentaries on this Rite. In the eighth and ninth centuries a controversy concerning the prayer at the Fraction produced much liturgical literature. The chronicle of a Syriac prelate, Patriarch Michael the Great, (d. 1199) discusses the question and supplies valuable contemporary documents.

The oldest West Syriac liturgy extant is the one ascribed, as in its Greek form, to Saint James, "the brother of the Lord". It is in the dialect of Edessa. The proanaphoral part of this is the Ordo communis to which the other later Anaphoras are joined.

This follows the Greek St. James with these differences:

- All the vesting prayers and preparation of the offering (Proskomide) are considerably expanded, and the prayers differ. This part of the Liturgy is most subject to modification; it began as private prayer only.
- The Monogenes comes later;
- the litany before the lessons is missing;
- the incensing is expanded into a more elaborate rite.
- The Trisagion comes after the lessons from the Old Testament; it contains the addition: "who wast crucified for us". This is the most famous characteristic of the Oriental Orthodox iteration of the rite. The clause was added by Peter the Dyer (Fullo), miaphysite Patriarch of Antioch (d. 488), was believed to imply miaphysitism and caused much controversy during these times, eventually becoming a kind of watchword to the Syriac Oriental Orthodox.
- The litany between the lessons is represented by the phrase Kyrie eleison said thrice.
- There is no chant at the Great Entrance (a Byzantine addition in the Greek Rite).
- The long Offertory prayers of the Greek Rite do not occur.
- The Epiklesis and Intercession are much the same as in Greek.
- The Our Father follows the Fraction.
- At the Communion-litany the answer is Halleluiah instead of Kyrie eleison.

In this Syriac Liturgy many Greek forms remain, e.g. Stomen kalos, Kyrie eleison, Sophia, Proschomen. Renaudot gives also a second form of the Ordo communis (II, 12–28) with many variants.

To the Ordo communis, the Syriac Church has added a very great number of alternative Anaphoras, many of which have not been published. These Anaphoras are ascribed to all manner of people; they were composed at very different periods. One explanation of their attribution to various saints is that they were originally used on their feasts.

Eusèbe Renaudot translated and published 39 of these. After that, the Liturgy of St. James follows (in his work) a shortened form of the same. This is the one commonly used today. Then:

- Xystus, which is placed first in the Maronite books;
- of St Peter;
- another of St. Peter;
- of St John the Evangelist;
- of the Twelve Apostles;
- of St Mark;
- of St Clement of Rome;
- of St Dionysius;
- of St Ignatius;
- of St Julius of Rome;
- of St Eustathius;
- of St John Chrysostom;
- of St Chrysostom (from Chaldaean sources);
- of St Maruta;
- of St Cyril;
- of Dioscoros;
- of Philoxenus of Hierapolis;
- a second Liturgy also ascribed to him;
- of Severus of Antioch;
- of James Baradaeus;
- of Mathew the Shepherd;
- of St James of Botnan and Serug;
- of James of Edessa, the Interpreter;
- of Thomas of Heraclea;
- of Moses bar Kephas;
- of Philoxenus aka Lazarus bar Saptha of Baghdad;
- of the Doctors, arranged by John the Great, Patriarch (Compilation from the Fathers);
- of John of Basra;
- of Michael of Antioch;
- of Dionysius Bar-Salibi;
- of Gregory Bar-Hebraeus;
- of St John the Patriarch, called Acoemetus (Akoimetos);
- of St Dioscor of Kardu;
- John, Patriarch of Antioch;
- of Ignatius of Antioch (Joseph Ibn Wahib);
- of St Basil (another version, by Masius).

Brightman (pp. lviii–lix) mentions 64 liturgies as known, at least by name. Notes of this many of anaphoras will be found after each in Renaudot. In most cases all he can say is that he knows nothing of the real author; often the names affixed are otherwise unknown. Many anaphoras are obviously quite late, inflated with long prayers and rhetorical, expressions, many contain miaphysite ideas, some are insufficient at the consecration so as to be invalid. Baumstark (Die Messe im Morgenland, 44–46) thinks the Anaphora of St Ignatius most important, as containing parts of the old pure Antiochene Rite. He considers that many attributions to later miaphysite authors may be correct, that the Liturgy of Ignatius of Antioch (Joseph Ibn Wahib; d. 1304) is the latest. Most of these anaphoras have now fallen into disuse.

There is an Armenian version (shortened) of the Syriac St James. The liturgy is said in Syriac with (since the 15th century) many Arabic substitutions in the lessons and proanaphoral prayers. The lectionary and diaconicum have not been published and are poorly known. The vestments correspond almost exactly to those of the Byzantine Orthodox, except that the bishop wears a Latinized mitre. The calendar has few feasts. It follows in its main lines the older form of Antioch, observed also by the Church of the East, which is the basis of the Byzantine Calendar. Feasts are divided into three classes of dignity. Wednesday and Friday are fast-days. The Divine Office consists of Vespers, Compline, Nocturns, Lauds, Terce, Sext, and None, or rather of hours that correspond to these among Latins. Vespers always belongs to the following day. The great part of this consists of long poems composed for the purpose, like the Byzantine odes. Baptism is performed by immersion; the priest confirms at once with chrism blessed by the patriarch. Communion is administered under both kinds; the sick are anointed with oil blessed by a priest — the ideal is to have seven priests to administer it. The orders are bishop, priest, deacon, subdeacon, lector, and singer. There are many chorepiscopi, not ordained bishop. It will be seen, then, that the relatively small Syriac Church has followed much the same line of development in its rites as its Byzantine neighbours.

The Syriac Catholics, that is, those in communion with Rome, use the same rite as the Syriac Orthodox, but perhaps in a more organized manner. There is not much that can be called Romanizing in their books; but they have the advantage of well-arranged, well-edited, and well-printed books. The most prominent early modern and modern students of the West Syriac Rite (the Assemani, Renaudot, etc.) have been Catholic. Their knowledge and Western standards of scholarship in general are advantages from which the Syriac Catholics profit. Of the manifold Syriac Anaphoras, the Catholics use seven only — those of St James, St John, St Peter, St Chrysostom, St Xystus, St Matthew, and St Basil. That of St Xystus is attached to the Ordo communis in their official book; that of St John is said on the chief feasts. The lessons only are in Arabic. It was inevitable that the Syriac Liturgies, coming from miaphysite sources, should be examined at Rome before they are allowed to Syriac Catholics, but the revisers made very few changes. Out of the mass of anaphoras they chose those believed to be the oldest and purest, leaving out the long series of later ones that they regarded as unorthodox, or even invalid. In the seven kept for Syriac Catholic use what alterations have been made are chiefly the omission of redundant prayers, and the simplication of confused parts in which the Diaconicum and the Euchologion had become mixed together. The only substantive change is the omission of the clause: "Who was crucified for us" in the Trisagion. There is no suspicion of modifying in the direction of the Roman Rite. The other books of the Catholics — Diaconicum, officebook, and ritual — are edited at Rome, Beirut, and the Patriarchal press Sharfé; they are considerably the most accessible, the best-arranged books in which to study this rite.

The Saint Thomas Christian community of India, who originally belonged to the Province of India of the Church of the Eastand they were following the East Syriac Rite till the sixteenth century, when the interventions of the Portuguese Padroado missionaries led to a schism among them. Following the schism in 1665, one of the two factions that emerged (the Puthenkoor) made contact with the Syriac Orthodox Church through Archbishop Gregorios Abdal Jaleel. Links with the Syriac Orthodox Church were further strengthened in the course of time, as other Syriac Orthodox prelates continued to work among them and to replace their original liturgical rite. Maphrian Baselios Yaldo and Baselios Shakrallah were prominent among them. In this way the West Syriac liturgical tradition was gradually introduced to them, and thus the descendants of the Puthenkoor, which includes the Jacobite Syrian Christian Church, Malankara Orthodox Syrian Church, Malankara Marthoma Syrian Church, Syro-Malankara Catholic Church and Malabar Independent Church, currently employ the West Syriac Rite.

== See also ==
- Holy Qurobo
- Syriac Orthodox Church
- Syriac Catholic Church
- Maronite Church
- Miaphysitism
- East Syriac Rite
- Malankara Jacobite Syrian Orthodox Church
- Malankara Orthodox Syrian Church
- Malankara Marthoma Syrian Church

== Sources ==
- Brock, Sebastian P. (1992). Studies in Syriac Christianity: History, Literature, and Theology. Aldershot: Variorum. ISBN 9780860783053.
- Brock, Sebastian P. (1996). Syriac Studies: A Classified Bibliography, 1960-1990. Kaslik: Parole de l'Orient.
- Brock, Sebastian P. (1997). A Brief Outline of Syriac Literature. Kottayam: St. Ephrem Ecumenical Research Institute. ISBN 978-1-61143-563-4.
- Brock, Sebastian P. (2006). Fire from Heaven: Studies in Syriac Theology and Liturgy. Aldershot: Ashgate. ISBN 9780754659082.
- Meyendorff, John (1989). Imperial unity and Christian divisions: The Church 450–680 A.D. The Church in history. Vol. 2. Crestwood, NY: St. Vladimir's Seminary Press. ISBN 9780881410563.
