= George, Bishop of the Arabs =

Syriac Orthodox bishop of the Arabs (died 724)

George (Syriac Giwargi; died 724) was the Syriac Orthodox bishop of the Arabs around Aleppo and the upper Euphrates from 686 or 687 until his death. A polymath steeped in ancient Greek philosophy, his writings are an important source for Syriac history and theology.

George was born in the vicinity of Antioch around 640 or 660. His native language was Syriac, but he learned Greek and perhaps Arabic. He began his education as a small child with a periodeut named Gabriel. He became associated with the monastery of Qenneshre, where he studied under Severus Sebokht and may have acquired Greek. He was a disciple of Patriarch Athanasius II of Antioch and a personal friend of Jacob of Edessa and John of Litharb. Shortly before his death, Athanasius ordered Bishop Sargis Zakunoyo to ordain George as bishop of the Arab (Note: The Syriac word is ṭayyāyē, from Banū Ṭayy, and means either Arabs or nomads.) nations. This took place in November 686 or 687. The nations or tribes (Note: The Syriac word is ʿammē. In some cases, George is referred to as "bishop of the Arab nations and the Ṭuʿāyē and ʿAqulāyē" or simply as "bishop of the nations".) that George served as bishop were the Tanukāyē, Ṭūʿāyē and ʿAqulāyē. They were generally bilingual in Syriac and Arabic. The heartlands of these tribes and thus George's diocese lay in northern Syria and Upper Mesopotamia. His seat was at ʿAqula. He died in 724. (Note: Barsoum 2003, p. 354, and Fiey 2004, p. 83, give his date of death as 725 and 725 or 726, respectively.)

George wrote on a variety of topics, but his most important works are his translations of Aristotle from Greek into Syriac. He translated—or revised earlier translations of—the Categories, On Interpretation and the first two books of the Prior Analytics, adding original introductions to each. He completed the seventh and final book of Jacob of Edessa's encyclopaedic Hexaemeron, a treatise on the six days of Creation, after Jacob's death in 708. He also wrote a commentary on the West Syriac liturgy for baptism and communion, and scholia (explanatory notes) to the orations of Gregory of Nazianzus. Among the poems attributed to him are a sermon on the life of Severus of Antioch and treatises on the monastic life, Palm Sunday, the Forty Martyrs of Sebaste and funeral services for bishops. The poem Myron has been attributed to him, but also to Jacob of Serug. Eleven of George's letters are preserved. They deal with matters of philosophy, astronomy, theology, literary criticism, liturgy and asceticism. They are an important source for the early development of Islamic kalām (philosophical theology). The nomocanon of Bar Hebraeus attributes to George the ruling that "a priest or a deacon who gives the Eucharist to the heretics shall be deposed".

George was celebrated as a saint by the Maronites, who kept his feast on Saint George's Day (23 April). The Syriac Orthodox patriarch Ignatius Aphrem I gave him the honorific mar, but there is no record of his being treated as a saint otherwise.

== Editions of works ==
- Connolly, Robert H.; Codrington, Humphrey W., eds. (1913). Two Commentaries on the Jacobite Liturgy by George Bishop of the Arab Tribes and Moses Bar Kepha, together with the Syriac Anaphora of St. James and a Document Entitled The Book of Life. London. pp. 11–23, 3*–15*.
- McVey, Kathleen E., ed. (1993). George, Bishop of the Arabs: A Homily on the Blessed Mar Severus. Peeters.
- Varghese, Baby (2006). "George, Bishop of the Arabs (†724), Homily on the Consecration of Myron". Harp. 19: 255–280.

== Bibliography ==
- Albert, Micheline (2002). "George of the Arabs". In André Vauchez (ed.). Encyclopedia of the Middle Ages. James Clarke & Co. ISBN 9780227679319.
- Barsoum, Ignatius Aphram (2003). The Scattered Pearls: A History of Syriac Literature and Sciences. Translated by Matti Moosa (2nd rev. ed.). Gorgias Press.
- Brock, Sebastian P. (2011). "Giwargi, bp. of the Arab tribes". In Sebastian P. Brock; Aaron M. Butts; George A. Kiraz; Lucas Van Rompay (eds.). Gorgias Encyclopedic Dictionary of the Syriac Heritage: Electronic Edition. Beth Mardutho.
- Brock, Sebastian P. (2018). "George, Bishop of the Arab Tribes, Mimro on the Myron (British Library, Add. 12,165)". Syriac Orthodox Patriarchal Journal. 56: 1–28.
- Cross, F. L.; Livingstone, E. A., eds. (2005). "George". George (c. 640–724). The Oxford Dictionary of the Christian Church (3rd rev. ed.). Oxford University Press. ISBN 978-0-19-280290-3.
- Fiey, Jean Maurice (2004). Saints Syriaques. Darwin Press.
- Miller, Dana (1993). "George, Bishop of the Arab Tribes, on True Philosophy". Aram. 5: 303–320.
- Rilliet, F. (1992). "George, Bishop of the Arabs". Encyclopedia of the Early Church. James Clarke & Co. pp. 343–345.
- Schrier, Omert J. (1991). "Chronological Problems Concerning the Lives of Severus bar Mašqā, Athanasius of Balad, Julianus Romāyā, Yohannān Sābā, George of the Arabs and Jacob of Edessa". Oriens Christianus. 75: 62–90.
- Tannous, Jack B. (2008). "Between Christology and Kalām? The Life and Letters of George, Bishop of the Arab Tribes". In George A. Kiraz (ed.). Malphono w-Rabo d-Malphone: Studies in Honor of Sebastian P. Brock. Gorgias Press. pp. 671–716. doi:10.31826/9781463214814-032. ISBN 9781463214814.
- Tannous, Jack B. (2018a). "George, Bishop of the Arab Tribes". In Oliver Nicholson (ed.). The Oxford Dictionary of Late Antiquity. Vol. 1. Oxford University Press. pp. 653–654. ISBN 978-0-19-866277-8.
- Tannous, Jack B. (2018b). The Making of the Medieval Middle East: Religion, Society, and Simple Believers. Princeton University Press.
- Võõbus, Arthur (1973). "The Discovery of New Important memre by Giwargi, the Bishop of the Arabs". Journal of Semitic Studies. 18 (2): 235–237. doi:10.1093/jss/XVIII.2.235.
- Watt, John W. (2015). "The Prolegomena to Aristotelian Philosophy of George, Bishop of the Arabs". In Sidney Harrison Griffith; Sven Grebenstein (eds.). Christsein in der islamischen Welt: Festschrift für Martin Tamcke zum 60. Geburtstag. Harrassowitz Verlag. pp. 141–163.
- Watt, John W. (2018). "George, Bishop of the Arabs". In David G. Hunter; Paul J. J. van Geest; Bert Jan Lietaert Peerbolte (eds.). Brill Encyclopedia of Early Christianity Online. Brill. doi:10.1163/2589-7993_EECO_SIM_00001411.
