= Isaac of Antioch =

Syriac writer

Isaac of Antioch, also known as Isaac of Amid or Isaac the Syrian, is one of the stars of Syriac literature, and the reputed author of a large number of metrical homilies, many of which are distinguished by an originality and acumen rare among Syriac writers. The mid-6th century Chronicle of Edessa gives his date of death as 451–452; and the Chronicle of Michael the Syrian makes him contemporary with Nonus, who became the 31st bishop of Edessa in 449.

== Life ==
Considerable difficulty exists in reconstructing the biography of Isaac. Eastern and Western texts on the topic were collected by Assemani (B.O. i. 2072 14), who concluded that Isaac flourished during the reign of the Byzantine emperor Theodosius II, and that he was a native either of Amid (Diyarbakir) or of Edessa, both located in modern-day Turkey. Several writers identify him a disciple of Ephrem the Syrian also named Isaac. A contrary testimony according to the patriarch Bar Shushan (d. 1073), who made a collection of his homilies, asserts his master was a disciple of Ephrem named Zenobius.

He is supposed to have migrated to Antioch, and to have become abbot of one of the convents in its neighborhood. According to Zacharias Rhetor he visited Rome and other cities, and the Zuqnin Chronicle by Pseudo-Dionysius of Tell-Mahr informs us that he composed poems on the Secular Games of 404, and wrote on the destruction of Rome by Alaric I in 410. He also commemorated the destruction of Antioch by an earthquake in 459, so that he must have lived until about 460. Unfortunately these poems have perished.

== Authorship ==
When we examine the collection of homilies attributed to Isaac, a difficulty arises on two grounds.

1. The author of some of the poems is a fervent proponent of Chalcedonian orthodoxy (see especially Nos. 1–3 in Gustav Bickell's edition = 62–64 in Paul Bedjan's), in other and more important homilies (such as Bickell 6, 8 = Bedjan 59, 61, and especially Bedjan 60) the doctrine is monophysite, even though Eutyches and Nestorius are equally condemned.
2. One of the monophysite homilies, the famous poem of 2136 lines on the parrot which uttered the Trisagion in the streets of Antioch (Bickell, 8 = Bedjan 61), appears to have been written at Antioch after Peter the Fuller (patriarch 471–488) raised the dispute about the addition to the doxology of the words qui crucifixus es pro nobis. It is therefore scarcely possible that the author of this homily should be the same who composed the lost poems on the secular games in 404 and on the sack of Rome.

Moreover, T. J. Lamy (S. Ephraemi hymni et sermones, iv. 361–364) and Bedjan (Homiliae S. Isaaci, i. pp. iv-ix) have called attention to statements made by Jacob of Edessa (708) in a letter to John the Stylite. He says there were three Isaacs who wrote in Syriac, two Monophysite and one Chalcedonian:

1. The first, he says, a native of Amid, and pupil of S. Ephraim, visited Rome in the time of Arcadius (395–408), on his return journey suffered imprisonment at Constantinople, and afterwards became a priest in the church of Amid.
2. The second was a priest of Edessa, and flourished in the reign of Zeno (474–491). He went up to Antioch in the time of Peter the Fuller. Jacob then tells the story of the parrot (see above).
3. The third was also an Edessene. At first in the days of Bishop Paul (510–522) he was monophysite, but afterwards in the time of the Chalcedonian bishop Asclepius he wrote poems setting forth "Nestorian" (i.e. Chalcedonian) doctrine.

With such conflicting evidence it is impossible to arrive at a certain result. But Jacob is an early witness: and on the whole it seems safe to conclude with Bedjan (p. ix) that works by at least two authors have been included in the collection attributed to Isaac of Antioch. Still the majority of the poems are the work, of one hand the 5th-century monophysite who wrote the poem on the parrot. A full list of the 191 poems existing in European MSS. is given by Bickell, who copied out 181 with a view to publishing them all: the other 10 had been previously copied by Pius Zingerle. But the two volumes published by Bickell in his lifetime (Gießen, 1873 and 1877) contain only 37 homilies. Bedjan's edition, of which the first volume has alone appeared (Paris, 1903) contains 67 poems, viz. 24 previously published (18 by Bickell), and 43 that are new, though their titles are all included in Bickell's list.

== Homilies ==
The writer's main interest lies in the application of religion to the practical duties of life, whether in the church or in the world. He has a great command of forcible language and considerable skill in apt illustration. The zeal with which he denounces the abuses prevalent in the church of his day, and particularly in the monastic orders, is not unlike that of the Protestant reformers.

He shows acquaintance with many phases of life. He describes the corruption of judges, the prevalence of usury and avarice, the unchastity which especially characterized the upper classes, and the general hypocrisy of so-called Christians. His doctrinal discussions are apt to be diffuse; but he seldom loses sight of the bearing of doctrine on practical life. He judges with extreme severity those who argue about religion while neglecting its practice, and those who though stupid and ignorant dare to pry into mysteries which are sealed to the angels. "Not newly have we found Him, that we should search and pry into God. As He was He is: He changeth not with the times. ... Confess that He formed thee of dust: search not the mode of His being: Worship Him that He redeemed thee by His only Son: inquire not the manner of His birth."

Some of Isaac's works have an interest for the historian of the 5th century. In two poems (Bickell II, 12 = Bedjan 48, 49), written probably at Edessa, he commemorates the capture of Beth-Uur, a city near Nisibis, by the Arabs. Although the historical allusions are far from clear, we gather that Beth-Uur, which in zealous paganism had been a successor to Uaran, had been in earlier days devastated by the Persians; but for the last 34 years the Persians had themselves suffered subjection. And now had come a flood of Arab invaders, sons of Hagar, who had swept away the city and carried all its inhabitants captive.

From these two poems, and from the 2nd homily on Fasting (Bickell 14 = Bedjan 17) we gain a vivid picture of the miseries borne by the inhabitants of that frontier region during the wars between Persia and the Romano-Greek empire. There are also instructive references to the heathen practices and the worship of pagan deities (such as Baalti, Uzzi, Gedlath and the planet Venus) prevalent in Mesopotamia. Two other poems (Bickell 35-36 = Bedjan 66–67), written probably at Antioch, describe the prevalence of sorcery and the extraordinary influence possessed by Chaldeans and enchanters over women who were nominally Christians.

The date of Isaac of Nineveh is now known from the Liber fundatorum of Ishoʿdnaḥ of Baṣra, an 8th-century writer; see Bedjan's edition, and Chabot, Livre de la chasteté, p. 63. Assemani (B.O. i. 445) had placed him late in the 6th century, and Chabot (De S. Isaaci Ninivitae vita, &c.) in the second half of the 5th.

Lamy (op. cit. iv. 364–366) has pointed out that several of the poems are in certain MSS. attributed to Ephraim. Possibly the author of the orthodox poems was not named Isaac at all.

Assemani's list of 104 poems (B.O. i. 254–234) is completely covered by Bickell's.

The metre of all the published homilies is heptasyllabic.

== Translations ==
- Becker, A. H. (2024). Isaac of Antioch: Homilies on Moral and Monastic Reform. United States: SBL Press.
