= Simeon the Potter =

Syriac Christian poet

Simeon the Potter (known also as Shemʿun Quqoyo in Syriac) was a poet and author of Syriac literature in the 5th–6th centuries. He lived in north Syria, born in the village of Kishir in the province of Antioch, where he composed nine short stanzaic homilies on the Nativity of Jesus that survive until the present day. Simeon's hymns on the Nativity also covered the resurrection and miracles of Jesus, the Crucifixion, the Prophets, Mary, the saints, and repentance.

His work would have gone unnoticed had it not been for the recognition of his talents by Jacob of Serugh, one of the greatest poets of Syriac traditions. In Syriac tradition, it is said that Jacob heard of his reputation while he was travelling and made the decision to visit him in his village, around the year 510 AD. Jacob met Simeon and listened to his work. Impressed, he commended him to continue his practice, and took copies along with him. Jacob translated some of these into Greek, and in 514 AD, Jacob showed the poetry of Simeon to Severus of Antioch. Severus was also impressed with Simeon's work, offering Simeon further encouragement to continue writing poems. Simeon's reputation continued into later eras; in the late seventh century, Jacob of Edessa wrote "the shop of Simon and his wheel are still known in the village of Kishir until this day."

In 2010, all nine homilies were translated into English by Sebastian Brock. A critical edition of the Syriac text was previously produced in 1913.

== Name ==
The origins of Simeon's epithet, "The Potter" (Quqoyo), are not known. It is thought that it is related to the practice of pottery (as a profession) or to a lost place name (toponym).

== Life ==
Outside of what is found in the poems attributed to Simeon, little is known about his life.
