= John Psaltes =

John Psaltes was the abbot of Qenneshre in the late 6th century.

He wrote hymns in Greek that were translated by Paul of Edessa into Syriac, probably while Paul was on Cyprus in the 620s. The Syriac translation was revised in 675 by Jacob of Edessa. Around 600, John wrote a hymn in honour of the martyrs of Najran. He may have relied on the Syriac Book of the Himyarites, since the hymn's brief introduction gives the name of Dhū Nuwās, the persecutor of Najran, as Masrūq, a name otherwise only attested in the Book. The hymn has been translated into English by Ernest Walter Brooks.

== Works cited ==
- Brooks, Ernest W. (1911). "James of Edessa: The Hymns of Severus of Antioch and Others, II". Patrologia Orientalis. 7 (5): 181–390.
- Moberg, Axel (2010) [1924]. The Book of the Himyarites: Fragments of a Hitherto Unknown Syriac Work. Gorgias Press.
- Tannous, Jack B. (2018). The Making of the Medieval Middle East: Religion, Society, and Simple Believers. Princeton University Press.
