= Jacob of Edessa =

Syriac Orthodox saint, bishop of Edessa (c. 640–708)

Mār Jacob of Edessa
- Saint
- A Syriac icon of St. Jacob absorbed in study
- Native name: ܝܰܥܩܽܘܒ ܐܽܘܪܗܰܝܳܐ
- Church: Syriac Orthodox Church
- Diocese: Edessa
- See: Antioch

Personal details
- Born: Ya'qub c. 640 AD Aindaba
- Died: 708 AD Edessa (modern-day Şanlıurfa, Turkey)

Sainthood
- Feast day: June 5
- Venerated in: Oriental Orthodox Church, especially Syriac Orthodox Church

Jacob of Edessa or James of Edessa (Syriac: ܝܰܥܩܽܘܒ ܐܽܘܪܗܰܝܳܐ, romanized: Yaʿqub Urhāyā; c. 640 – 5 June 708) was a Syriac Orthodox bishop of Edessa, scholar, and translator. Renowned for his multilingual mastery, he made lasting contributions to biblical revision, canon law, grammar and liturgy, and played a key role in standardizing theological terminology. His synthesis of Greek and Syriac traditions shaped the development of Syriac Christianity and facilitated the transmission of Hellenistic thought into the Islamic world.

Mor Ignatius Zakka I Iwas, the late Syriac Orthodox Patriarch of Antioch, ranked Jacob among the greatest Syriac Orthodox Fathers, alongside Ephrem the Syrian, Jacob Baradaeus, Philoxenus of Mabbug, Severus of Antioch, and Michael the Syrian.

== Life ==
Jacob of Edessa was born in Aindaba (Syriac: ܥܝܢܕܐܒܐ; Arabic: عين دابا; lit. 'Well of the Wolf'), about 50 km west of Aleppo, in the district of Gumah near Antioch. His life is mostly known from the account by Gregory Bar Hebraeus.

Jacob received his early education at the Monastery of Aphthonia (Qenneshre, also called Qenneshrin) on the left bank of the Euphrates, where he studied under the famous scholar Severus Sebokht. At Qenneshre he mastered both Greek and Syriac, laying the foundation for his later work in biblical translation and textual revision. He later traveled to Alexandria to continue his studies before returning to Syria.

Upon his return, Jacob entered monastic life at Edessa, where he soon gained a reputation for learning. In 672 or 684, he was ordained a priest and consecrated metropolitan (bishop) of Edessa by Athanasius II of Balad, the Syriac Orthodox Patriarch of Antioch. His episcopacy lasted only three or four years. Jacob strictly enforced the canons of the Church, which brought him into conflict with clergy there. When Athanasius died, his successor Julian II did not support him, and in response to Julian’s suggestion that he soften his stance, Jacob publicly burned a copy of the neglected canons outside the patriarch’s residence. He then resigned and retired to the convent of Mar Jacob of Kaisumn near Samosata, accompanied by two disciples, Daniel and Constantine.

Jacob was later invited to the Monastery of Eusebona, where he remained for eleven years teaching Greek, instructing students in the Psalms, and training them in the reading of the Scriptures in Greek. His tenure there ended after opposition from monks who disliked Greek learning. He then moved with seven of his students to the Great Convent of Tel ʿAde, one of several Syriac Orthodox monasteries on the so-called "mountain of Edessa" (possibly modern-day Tell Hadidi, northwest of Aleppo). There he spent nine years revising and amending the Peshitta version of the Old Testament with reference to various Greek versions.

Jacob played a leading role at the synod convened by Patriarch Julian II in 706. Two years later, in 708, he was recalled to the see of Edessa, but died only four months after his reinstatement.

== Doctrinal allegiance ==
Jacob of Edessa was a prominent bishop and scholar of the Syriac Orthodox Church, firmly aligned with the Miaphysite Christological position upheld by the Oriental Orthodox tradition. His writings consistently reflect this theological stance, affirming the unity of Christ’s human and divine natures into one composite nature without denying the reality of His humanity and divinity. In Syriac literature, Jacob holds a place comparable to that of St. Jerome in the Latin tradition for his linguistic scholarship and his biblical work.

In earlier scholarship, Giuseppe Simone Assemani attempted to present Jacob as theologically compatible with Chalcedonian Christianity per the Bibliotheca Orientalis, but later revised his view after reading Jacob’s biography by Bar Hebraeus, which makes his Miaphysite position explicit. Modern assessments of Jacob’s theology are aided by critical editions such as Das Buch der Erkenntnis der Wahrheit oder der Ursache aller Ursachen (Leipzig, 1889), with a posthumous German translation published in Strasbourg in 1893.

== Language ==
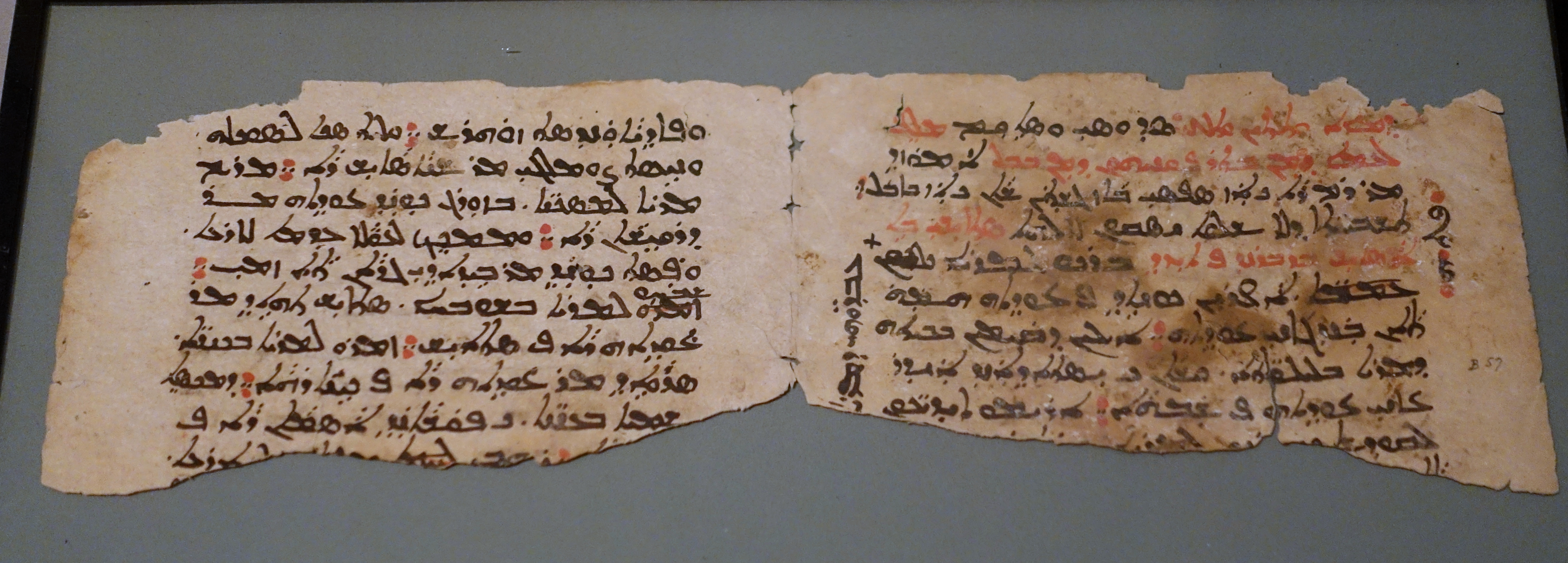
Syriac Psalter, 12th–13th century AD

Jacob was renowned for his mastery of Classical Syriac, Greek, and to a lesser degree, Hebrew. He wrote primarily in Classical Syriac, a literary and liturgical variety of Aramaic that originated in the kingdom of Osroene, centered in Edessa, and flourished from the 3rd to 8th centuries as the standardized language of Syriac Christianity.

In his writings, Jacob used several terms for his native tongue. Besides the common contemporary and regional designations Sūryāyā ("Syriac") and Aramāyā ("Aramaic"), he emphasized the distinctive features of the Edessan dialect, which had become the basis of Classical Syriac. He sometimes referred to it as Nahrāyā ("Mesopotamian language"), derived from Bet-Nahrayn (Syriac for "Mesopotamia"), and more specifically as Urhāyā ("Edessan language"), after Edessa (Urhoy in Syriac).

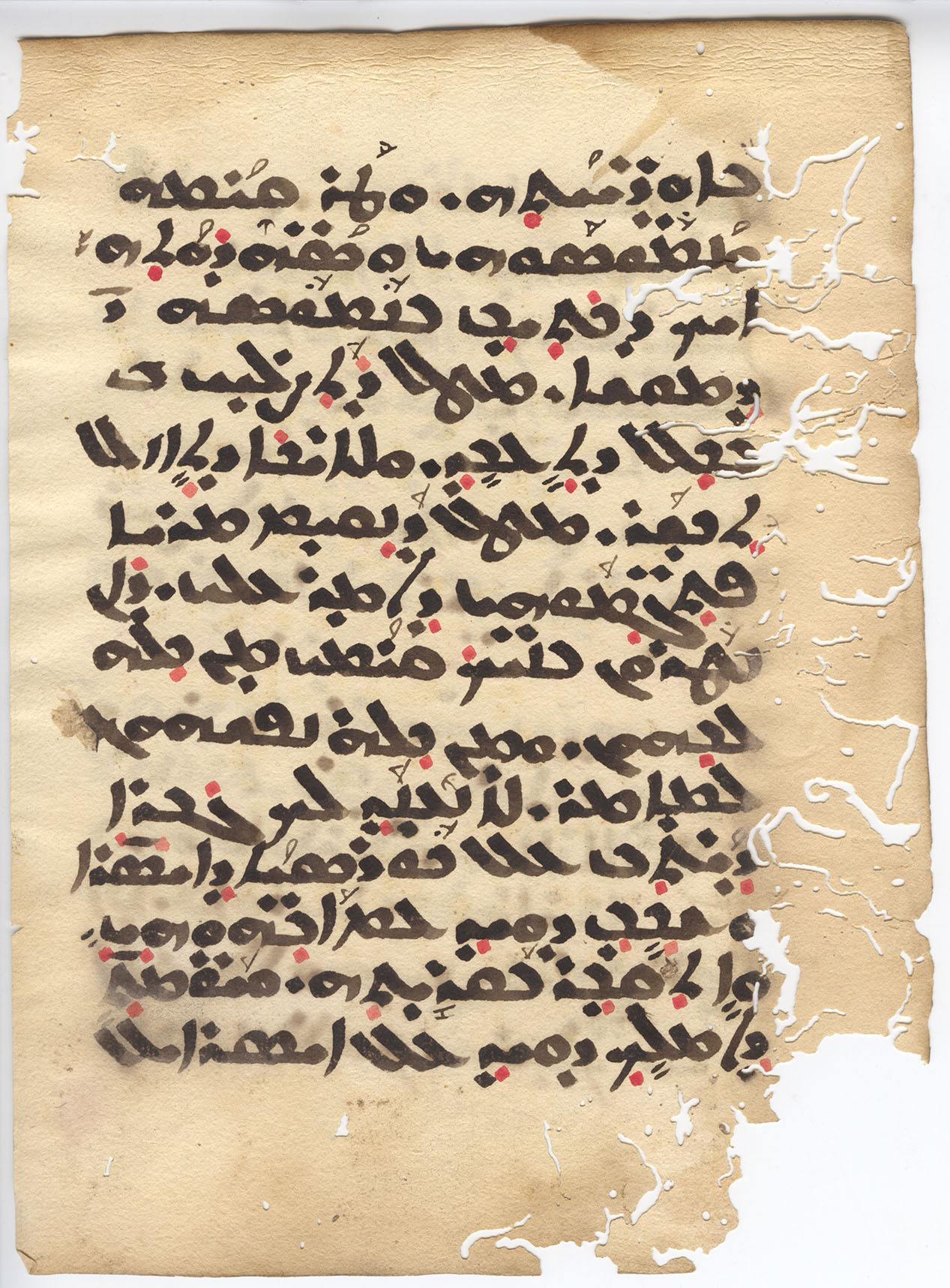
Leaf from a 16th century Syriac prayer book that utilizes Jacob's diacritics

Jacob’s deep knowledge of both Greek and Syriac allowed him to become one of the most important translators and terminologists of his time. Working in a culturally Hellenized milieu, he did not merely borrow Greek words but integrated Greek as a "graphic instrument" within Syriac writing. His translations from Greek into Syriac, along with his creation of new terms and refinement of existing ones, had a lasting impact on the development of Syriac vocabulary, especially in theological discourse. This was especially significant during the Christological controversies of the 5th and 6th centuries, when many non-Chalcedonian Christians from the Levant and Asia Minor were expelled eastward to Mesopotamia. They brought their Greek and Antiochian traditions and praxes with them, necessitating translations of their theological works into Syriac. Jacob played a major role in standardizing Greek theological terminology in Syriac and revising earlier translations for greater accuracy and clarity.

Although Syriac was his primary medium, Jacob also demonstrated some knowledge of Hebrew. He identified Hebrew — not Aramaic, as was commonly perceived at the time — as the original language of humanity spoken by Adam. He took pride in the kinship between the Hebrews and his own people, as well as the linguistic similarities of their languages. Jacob often expressed regret for not having mastered Hebrew more fully.

== Writings ==
Jacob of Edessa was a prolific and versatile writer whose surviving corpus, though only partially published, spans theology, biblical studies, canon law, liturgy, philosophy, grammar, history, and translation. Many of his works are preserved only in later quotations by authors such as Gregory Bar Hebraeus and Michael the Syrian. Early bibliographic accounts, such as Giuseppe Simone Assemani's Bibliotheca Orientalis and William Wright's Catalogue of the Syriac Manuscripts in the British Museum (1911), are significant sources for identifying his extant writings.

=== Biblical works and commentaries ===
Jacob undertook a revision of the Bible based on the Peshitta, producing what Wright described as "a curious eclectic or patchwork text." Five volumes of this revision survive in Europe, and it represents the last attempt at an Old Testament revision within the Syriac Orthodox Church. As the principal founder of the Syriac Massorah, Jacob oversaw careful preservation of the biblical text, such as MS Vatican Syriac 153. He wrote extensive biblical commentaries and scholia, frequently cited by later exegetes who hailed him as "the Interpreter of the Scriptures."

Jacob translated the apocryphal History of the Rechabites composed by Zosimus from Greek into Syriac. He also wrote a treatise on the six days of creation, in the genre of the Hexaemeral literature. Manuscripts of this exist at Leiden and at Lyon. It was his last work, and being left incomplete was finished by his friend George, bishop of the Arabs.

=== Canons and liturgy ===
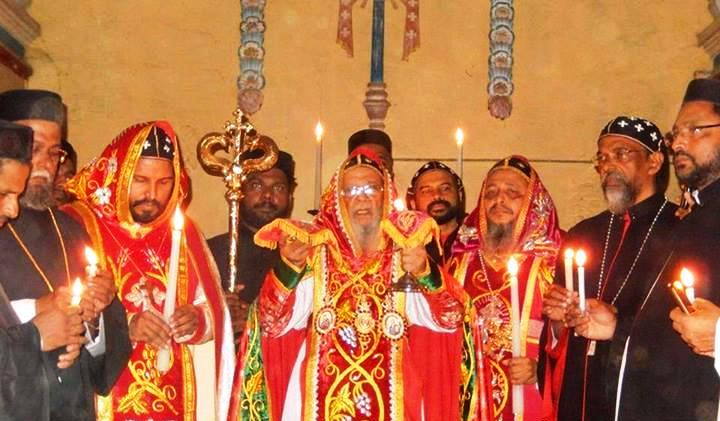
The Syriac Liturgy of Saint James, which Jacob helped develop, remains in use throughout Syriac Orthodox churches today, including this Jacobite Syrian Christian Church

Jacob compiled a collection of ecclesiastical canons. In his letter to the priest Addai, a set of canons is presented as responses to Addai's inquiries. This collection was edited by Lagarde in Reliquiae juris eccl. syriace and by Thomas Joseph Lamy in his dissertation. Additional canons were included in Wright's Notulae syriacae. All of these were translated and explained by Carl Kayser in Die Canones Jacobs von Edessa (Leipzig, 1886).

Jacob also made significant contributions to Syriac liturgy, both through original compositions and translations from Greek. As a liturgical author, he created an anaphora, revised the Liturgy of St. James. He also composed orders for baptism, the blessing of waters on the eve of Epiphany, and the celebration of matrimony. Additionally, he translated many of Severus of Antioch's works into Syriac one of which is the order of baptism.

=== Philosophy ===
Jacob’s principal philosophical work was the Enchiridion or Manual, a tract on philosophical terminology. While some translations of Aristotle were attributed to him, some may be the work of others; for instance, the De causa omnium causarum, once linked to Jacob, has been shown to be of later origin by another bishop of Edessa.

=== History ===
Jacob authored a Chronicon (Chronicle) that serves as a continuation of the Chronicon of Eusebius.This work is referenced and quoted by Michael the Syrian in book 7 of his own Chronicle. John of Litharb later wrote a continuation of Jacob's Chronicle, extending it to the year 726, which is also mentioned by Michael.

However, the original text of Jacob's continuation has largely been lost, with only 23 leaves surviving in a manuscript housed in the British Library. A detailed account of these leaves can be found in Wright's Catalogue (1062), and an edition of this material has been published in the CSCO by E.W. Brooks.

=== Grammar ===
Jacob made significant contributions to the Syriac language and script, particularly the West Syriac (Serṭā) tradition. Early Syriac lacked a consistent system for marking vowels, relying on sporadic dot notation. Jacob introduced five vowel signs adapted from Greek, written above the line as miniature symbols. This innovation remains a hallmark of West Syriac writing of the Syriac Orthodox Church, Syriac Catholic Church, and Maronite Church. He also refined the use of consonants as vowel indicators and attempted, unsuccessfully, to introduce the Greek practice of writing vowels on the same line as consonants. His Letter to George, bishop of Serugh, on orthography is ans important testimony to his insistence on scribal precision, and sets forth the importance of fidelity by scribes in the copying of minutiae of spelling.

=== Identity ===
For Jacob, a person was counted as Syrian, that is roughly, Aramean, by virtue of speaking Aramaic. He treats "Syrian" and "Aramean" as synonyms, and he says the Greeks referred to the Arameans as "Syrians" while noting that "Syrian" could also be applied to Greeks who lived within the borders of Roman Syria and bore the regional name; any inhabitant of the province could be called a Syrian, which is the only reason the Greeks were so described. To prevent confusion, he distinguishes between the Greeks who translated Scripture and the other Syrians, that is, the Arameans who received those translations; for the Arameans in Syria, the term emphasized their descent from Aram, who also spoke Syriac, and settled in the region west of the Euphrates. Thus, two terms for "Syrian" emerge: those who are regionally Syrian regardless of ethnic or linguistic background such as Greeks, and those who are ancestrally Aramean within the region of Syria.

Regarding the Arameans, Jacob believed they were the ancestors of the Assyrians, and he further held that the Assyrian kings, whom he calls Chaldean, belonged to the heritage of the Syrians as their supposed ancestors because they used "our Aramaic tongue and script" and "belonged to our tongue."

=== Other Works and translations ===
Jacob’s greatest translation achievement was his Syriac version of the Homiliae Cathedrales of Severus, Patriarch of Antioch. He also revised Paul of Edessa's translation of the hymns of John Psaltes. This important collection is partially known through E.W. Brooks's edition and translation of the sixth book of selected epistles of Severus, which is based on another Syriac version created by Athanasius of Nisibis in 669.

Jacob lists numerous Greek Fathers, including Gregory of Nazianzus, Gregory of Nyssa, Basil of Caesarea, John Chrysostom, Cyril of Alexandria, and Severus of Antioch, alongside Syriac Fathers such as Ephrem the Syrian, Philoxenus of Mabbug, and Jacob of Serugh, calling them "God-clad men" and "tried teachers." This synthesis of Greek and Syriac authorities is indicative of his deep engagement with both traditions.

=== Islam and cultural exchange ===
Though he spent much of his life in monastic seclusion, Jacob addressed issues relating to Islam in his letters. He commented on the Muslim views of the Virgin Mary, described the qibla, and offered guidance on Christian-Muslim relations, particularly regarding converts to and from Islam. He issued what is considered the first Syriac juristic opinion permitting Christian clergy to teach advanced subjects to Muslim children.

Jacob played a significant role in the cross-cultural transmission of knowledge. His translations and revisions, alongside those of other Syriac scholars, served as an intellectual bridge that facilitated the flow of Greek philosophy into the Islamic Caliphates, thereby influencing the translation movement in 9th-century Baghdad. This exchange among Syriac, Arabic, and Greek aided in the reintroduction of Aristotle to medieval Europe through Latin translations of Arabic texts.

=== Historical perspective ===
Dubbed "one of the most philhellenic of all Syriac authors" and said to be the Syriac version of the Latin Jerome of late antiquity, Jacob saw the Byzantine Empire in its Christian phase under Constantine the Great as heir to all previous kingdoms. He viewed his native Edessa as embodying a "Syro-Macedonian" heritage, tracing the Abgarid dynasty to Alexander the Great's companions; a claim supported by the alternative name of Edessa itself (Urhoy in Syriac). While his writings might initially suggest that he viewed the Byzantine Empire as the only legitimate state, this was not the case. Following the Council of Chalcedon, Jacob and subsequent Syriac writers rejected the legitimacy of all existing political powers — whether Byzantine, Frankish, or Muslim — and instead maintained that the true authority of the Syriac Orthodox Church was "not of this world".

== Veneration and legacy ==
Jacob of Edessa is venerated as a saint in the Oriental Orthodox communion, particularly within the Syriac Orthodox Church, where his feast day is celebrated on June 5. In 2008, the Patriarchate of Antioch proclaimed the year as the "Year of St. Jacob of Edessa" for the entire Syriac Orthodox Church, and he is considered to be one of the most significant scholars of the Christian-Aramean tradition. A church dedicated to St. Jacob of Edessa is located in Florida, USA.

=== Symposium ===
The Syriac Orthodox Church organized an international symposium in Aleppo, Syria from June 9 to 12, 2008, to commemorate the 1300th anniversary of Jacob’s passing. Scholars and clergy from across the globe gathered to examine Mor Jacob’s contributions as a chronicler, grammarian, exegete, theologian, liturgist, and canonist. The symposium opened with an address by Mor Gregorios Yohanna Ibrahim, Metropolitan of Aleppo, followed by a keynote lecture from Syriac studies scholar Sebastian Brock.

The program included visits to notable Syriac Christian heritage sites, including Monastery of Tell‘Ada (where Jacob spent his final decade and was buried), Monastery of St. Simeon the Stylite, Monastery of Qenneshrin, and city of Mabbug (Manbij) – birthplace of the Orthodox saint Empress Theodora and historical see of Philoxenus of Mabbug.

Due to the success of the symposium, it was decided to hold a similar Aleppo Syriac Colloquium (A.S.C.) every two years. The next event, planned for 2010, focused on Gregory Bar Hebraeus, another pivotal Father and saint of the Syriac Orthodox Church. However, the ongoing Syrian Civil War forced the cancellation of the 2012 meeting, and the series has since been suspended, especially after the abduction of Metropolitans Yohanna Ibrahim and Paul Yazigi by Islamist militants, whose fate remains unknown.

== See also ==
- Christology
- Non-Chalcedonian Christianity
- List of Syriac writers
- Syriac alphabet
- Jacob of Serugh
- Jacob Baradaeus
- Philoxenus of Mabbug

== Sources ==
- Brière, Maurice, ed. (1960). Les Homiliae Cathedrales de Sévère d'Antioche: Traduction syriaque de Jacques d'Édesse (suite): Introduction générale à toutes les homélies: Homélies CXX à CXXV. Patrologia Orientalis. Vol. 29. Paris: Firmin-Didot.
- Brock, Sebastian P. (1970). "A Calendar Attributed to Jacob of Edessa". Parole de l'Orient. 1 (2): 415–429.
- Brock, Sebastian P. (1979). "Jacob of Edessa's Discourse on the Myron". Oriens Christianus. 63: 20–36.
- Brock, Sebastian P. (2010). "Jacob the Annotator: Jacob's Annotations to His Revised Translation of Severus' Cathedral Homilies". Studies on Jacob of Edessa. Piscataway: Gorgias Press. pp. 1–13. doi:10.31826/9781463216634-002. ISBN 9781463216634.
- Brock, Sebastian P. (2019). "Jacob of Edessa's Letter to Addai on the Blessing of the Epiphany Water". Parole de l'Orient. 45: 119–132.
- Debié, Muriel (2009). "Syriac Historiography and Identity Formation". Church History and Religious Culture. 89 (1–3): 93–114. doi:10.1163/187124109X408014.
- Dinno, Khalid (2010). "The Physical World in Jacob of Edessa's Hexaemeron". Studies on Jacob of Edessa. Piscataway: Gorgias Press. pp. 15–26. doi:10.31826/9781463216634-003. ISBN 9781463216634.
- Farina, Margherita (2018). "La linguistique syriaque selon Jacques d'Édesse". Les auteurs syriaques et leur langue. Paris: Geuthner. pp. 167–187.
- Gigot, Francis (1910). "James of Edessa". The Catholic Encyclopedia. Vol. 8. New York: Robert Appleton Company. pp. 277–278.
- Ginkel, Jan J. van (2002). "Jakob von Edessa in der Chronographie des Michael Syrus". Syriaca: Zur Geschichte, Theologie, Liturgie und Gegenwartslage der syrischen Kirchen. Vol. 2. Münster: LIT Verlag. pp. 115–124. ISBN 9783825858001.
- Ginkel, Jan J. van (2005). "History and Community: Jacob of Edessa and the West Syrian Identity". Redefining Christian Identity: Cultural Interaction in the Middle East Since the Rise of Islam. Leuven: Peeters Publishers. pp. 67–75. ISBN 9789042914186.
- Hainthaler, Theresia (2010). "Jacob of Edessa and his Enchiridion: Some Remarks". Studies on Jacob of Edessa. Piscataway: Gorgias Press. pp. 27–42. doi:10.31826/9781463216634-004. ISBN 978-1-4632-1663-4.
- Harrak, Amir (2010). "Jacob of Edessa as a Chronicler". Studies on Jacob of Edessa. Piscataway: Gorgias Press. pp. 43–64. doi:10.31826/9781463216634-005. ISBN 9781463216634.
- Juckel, Andreas K. (2010). "Did Jacob of Edessa Revise the New Testament Peshitta?". Studies on Jacob of Edessa. Piscataway: Gorgias Press. pp. 65–80. doi:10.31826/9781463216634-006. ISBN 9781463216634.
- Kruisheer, Dirk; Rompay, Lucas van (1998). "A Bibliographical Clavis to the Works of Jacob of Edessa" (PDF). Hugoye: Journal of Syriac Studies. 1 (1): 35–56. doi:10.31826/hug-2010-010105. S2CID 212689087.
- This article incorporates text from a publication now in the public domain: McLean, Norman (1911). "Jacob of Edessa". In Chisholm, Hugh (ed.). Encyclopædia Britannica. Vol. 15 (11th ed.). Cambridge University Press. pp. 113–114.
- Minov, Sergey (2020). Memory and Identity in the Syriac Cave of Treasures: Rewriting the Bible in Sasanian Iran. Leiden-Boston: Brill. ISBN 9789004445512.
- Morony, Michael G. (2005). "History and Identity in the Syrian Churches". Redefining Christian Identity: Cultural Interaction in the Middle East Since the Rise of Islam. Leuven: Peeters Publishers. pp. 1–33. ISBN 9789042914186.
- Nestle, Eberhard (1878). "Jakob von Edessa über den Schem hammephorasch und andere Gottesnamen: Ein Beitrag zur Geschichte der Tetragrammaton". Zeitschrift der Deutschen Morgenländischen Gesellschaft. 32: 465–508, 735–736.
- Phillips, George (1864). Scholia on Passages of the Old Testament, by Mar Jacob, Bishop of Edessa. London and Edinburgh: Williams and Norgate.
- Phillips, George (1869). A Letter by Mār Jacob, Bishop of Edessa, on Syriac Orthography, also a Tract by the Same Author, and a Discourse by Gregory Bar Hebraeus on Syriac Accents. London and Edinburgh: Williams and Norgate.
- Price, Richard M. (2010). "The Christological Controversies of the Age of Jacob of Edessa". Studies on Jacob of Edessa. Piscataway: Gorgias Press. pp. 81–92. doi:10.31826/9781463216634-007. ISBN 9781463216634.
- Rompay, Lucas van (1999). "Jacob of Edessa and the Early History of Edessa". After Bardaisan: Studies on Continuity and Change in Syriac Christianity. Louvain: Peeters Publishers. pp. 269–285. ISBN 9789042907355.
- Rompay, Lucas van (2000). "Past and Present Perceptions of Syriac Literary Tradition" (PDF). Hugoye: Journal of Syriac Studies. 3 (1): 71–103. doi:10.31826/hug-2010-030105. S2CID 212688244.
- Rompay, Lucas van (2008). "Jacob of Edessa and the Sixth-Century Syriac Translator of Severus of Antioch's Cathedral Homilies". Jacob of Edessa and the Syriac Culture of His Day. Leiden-Boston: Brill. pp. 189–204. ISBN 978-9004173477.
- Salvesen, Alison (2008). "Jacob of Edessa's Life and Work: A Biographical Sketch". Jacob of Edessa and the Syriac Culture of His Day. Leiden-Boston: Brill. pp. 1–10. ISBN 978-9004173477.
- Salvesen, Alison (2010). "Was Jacob Trilingual? Jacob of Edessa's Knowledge of Hebrew Revisited". Studies on Jacob of Edessa. Piscataway: Gorgias Press. pp. 93–105. doi:10.31826/9781463216634-008. ISBN 9781463216634.
- Shemunkasho, Aho (2010). "A Verse-Homily Attributed to Jacob of Edessa: On Faith and Contra Nestorius". Studies on Jacob of Edessa. Piscataway: Gorgias Press. pp. 107–141. doi:10.31826/9781463216634-009. ISBN 9781463216634.
- Talmon, Rafi (2008). "Jacob of Edessa the Grammarian". Jacob of Edessa and the Syriac Culture of His Day. Leiden-Boston: Brill. pp. 159–187. ISBN 978-9004173477.
- Teule, Herman G. B. (2009). "Jacob of Edessa". Christian-Muslim Relations: A Bibliographical History. Vol. 1. Leiden-Boston: Brill. pp. 226–233. ISBN 9789004169753.
- Witakowski, Witold (2008). "The Chronicle of Jacob of Edessa". Jacob of Edessa and the Syriac Culture of His Day. Leiden-Boston: Brill. pp. 25–47. ISBN 978-9004173477.
- Wright, William (1867). "Two Epistles of Mār Jacob, Bishop of Edessa". Journal of Sacred Literature and Biblical Record. New Series. 10: 430–460.
- Wright, William (1871). Fragments of the Turrāṣ mamllā nahrāyā or Syriac Grammar of Jacob of Edessa. London: Gilbert and Rivington.
