= Patriarch Julian =

Patriarch Julian may refer to:

- Julian (Chalcedonian patriarch of Antioch), ruled 471–476
- Julian I (Miaphysite patriarch of Antioch), also head of the Syriac Orthodox Church, ruled 591–595
- Julian II the Roman, patriarch of Antioch and head of the Syriac Orthodox Church, ruled 688–708
