= John of Dara =

John (fl. c. 825–860), in Syriac Iwannis, was a Syriac Orthodox writer and the metropolitan bishop of Dara (Anastasiopolis). He wrote extensively on theology, philosophy and liturgy in the Syriac language.

== Life ==
Nothing is known of John's life beyond the facts that around 825 he was consecrated as metropolitan of Dara by Patriarch Dionysios of Tel Maḥre and that before that he was a monk of Mar Hananya. In 837, Dionysios dedicated to John his now lost Ecclesiastical History. He addresses him in the preface, which has been preserved in Michael the Great's chronicle:

Since your soul is set insatiably and with an unbridled desire upon the accumulation of wisdom, you, who are dearer than any to me, my spiritual son [John], metropolitan of Dara; and since divine learning is not enough for you, nor the dogmas of Orthodoxy, in which you have been trained from the softness of your fingernails until the silvering of your hair ... I perceive you are so enflamed with the desire to accumulate wisdom, that you must also muse upon the texts containing narratives of the events that have occurred in the world. But should you not be taking the trouble necessary to supply your own entertainment? ... Yet, because I have been coerced by the force of your zest to remember that I, too, if the truth be told, used to feel that urge, so much so that I once communicated to many people my enthusiasm to see what has happened and is happening in our times written down for the generations to come—but they declined to do so—I have at last made up my mind to shoulder this burden also . . .

One of John's treatises can be dated to the patriarchate of Dionysios' successor, John IV (846–873). An epitome of the same treatise was written in response to a request from the maphrian Basil II (848–858). John seems to have died in 860, for that is when his successor, Athanasius Ḥakim, was consecrated, according to Michael the Great.

== Works ==
Attributed to John are treatises on the soul (in eight chapters), Paradise, Creation, the economy of salvation, the resurrection of Jesus, Pentecost, the discovery of the True Cross, demons, and Christian doctrine in general. He also wrote a treatise against heretics, an anaphora and a commentary on the Pseudo-Dionysian works On the Celestial Hierarchy and On the Ecclesiastical Hierarchy. A treatise on the priesthood (in four chapters) is attributed to him in some manuscripts but to John Maron in others, and by some to Mushe bar Kipho. None of these have been published beyond a few quotations. His only published works are a treatise on the eucharist in four chapters, known by its Latin title De oblatione or as the Commentary on the Liturgy, and his four commentaries on the resurrection of the body.

In De oblatione, John uses the phrase "putting on the body" to describe the Incarnation. This phrase, common in the Syriac of the dyophysite Church of the East, had become rare among the monophysite Syriac Orthodox in John's time. He compares the putting on the body of the Word (Jesus) with the priest's putting on the vestments.

John's treatise on the soul, known from two manuscripts and still unpublished, has been studied in some detail. It incorporates an entire treatise on the same subject by John of Atarib. He also quotes from the pseudo-Platonic treatise On the Subsistence of Soul's Virtues, which was written originally in Greek but survives only in Arabic. John's Syriac quotations seem to show that a full Syriac translation was made and that the Arabic translation was made from it. In his treatise on the soul, John proposed a novel classification of vices, which he may have taken from the Greek work: every vice is opposed to a virtue and to another vice. Although this would mean that there are twice as many vices as virtues, each virtue represents the balance of its opposing vices.

According to Bar Hebraeus' Hudoye (nomocanon), written in the 13th century, the writings of John were required reading the monasteries. Jacob bar Ṣalibi cites his commentary on either the whole New Testament or just the Gospels, but this work appears to be lost.

== Editions ==
- Sader, Jean, ed. (1970). Le "De Oblatione" de Jean de Dara. Corpus Scriptorum Christianorum Orientalium, 308–309. Vol. 2 vols. Peeters.
  (A critical edition of the Syriac text.)
- Shemunkasho, Aho, ed. (2020). John of Dara: On The Resurrection of Human Bodies. Bibliotheca Nisibinensis, 4. Gorgias Press.
- Varghese, Baby, ed. (1999). John of Dara: Commentary on the Eucharist. Moran Etho, 12. St. Ephrem Ecumenical Research Institute.
  (An English translation of Sader's text.)

== Bibliography ==
- Barsoum, Ignatius Aphram (2003). The Scattered Pearls: A History of Syriac Literature and Sciences. Translated by Matti Moosa (2nd revised ed.). Gorgias Press.
- Brock, Sebastian (1997). A Brief Outline of Syriac Literature. St. Ephrem's Ecumenical Research Institute.
- Brock, Sebastian P. (2018) [2011]. "Iwannis of Dara". In Sebastian P. Brock; Aaron M. Butts; George A. Kiraz; Lucas Van Rompay (eds.). Gorgias Encyclopedic Dictionary of the Syriac Heritage: Electronic Edition. Gorgias Press [online ed. Beth Mardutho].
- Palmer, Andrew (1993). The Seventh Century in the West-Syrian Chronicles. Liverpool University Press.
- Shemunkasho, Aho (2010). "Jacob of Serugh and His Influence on John of Dara as Exemplified by the Use of Two Verse-Homilies". In George Kiraz (ed.). Jacob of Serugh and His Times: Studies in Sixth-Century Syriac Christianity. Gorgias Press. pp. 163–198.
- Võõbus, Arthur (1976). "Important Manuscript Discoveries of Iwannis of Dara and His Literary Heritage". Journal of the American Oriental Society. 96 (4): 576–578. doi:10.2307/600090. JSTOR 600090.
- Wright, William (1894). A Short History of Syriac Literature (PDF). Adam and Charles Black.
- Zonta, Mauro (2014). "Iwānnīs of Dārā's Treatise on the Soul and Its Sources: A New Contribution to the History of Syriac Psychology around 800 AD". In E. Coda; C. Martini Bonadeo (eds.). De l'Antiquité tardive au Moyen Âge: Études de logique aristotélicienne et de philosophie grecque, syriaque, arabe et latine ofertes à Henri Hugonnard-Roche. Études Musulmanes, 44. Vrin and Paris. pp. 113–122.
- Zonta, Mauro (2015). "Iwānnīs of Dārā On Soul's Virtues: About a Late Antiquity Greek Philosophical Work among Syrians and Arabs" (PDF). Studia graeco-arabica. 5: 129–143.
