= Philoxenian version =

The inter-relationship between various significant ancient manuscripts of the Old Testament (some identified by their siglum). LXX here denotes the original Septuagint.

The Philoxenian version (508) is a revision of earlier Syriac versions of the Bible. It was commissioned by Philoxenus of Mabbug and completed by his chorepiscopus Polycarp. Philoxenos' revisions were initiated by concerns that some of the Peshitto readings gave support to Nestorian theology. It became the received Bible of the Syrian Miaphysites during the 6th century.

It was followed by the Harklean Version, an Aramaic language Bible translation by Thomas of Harqel completed in 616 AD in Egypt which was partly based on the Philoxenian version, and partly a new and very literal translation from the Greek New Testament.
