= Paul of Edessa (translator) =

Mar Paul (Syriac: Pawla), usually known as Paul of Edessa or Paul of Cyprus, was the Byzantine Syriac Orthodox metropolitan of Edessa who was forced to abandon his see between about 602 and 629, when it fell under the Sasanian Empire. He was an important translator of Greek theological works into Syriac. He should not be confused with the Bishop Paul of Edessa who died in 526.

According to Jacob of Edessa, Paul fled to Egypt with many other bishops to escape the Sasanian invasion and occupation of Mesopotamia precipitated by the defection and rebellion of Narses, governor of Mesopotamia, who seized Edessa with Sasanian support in 602–03. He then fled Egypt for Cyprus to escape the Sasanian conquest of Egypt in 618–621. At the time of his translation work on Cyprus he was described as an archimandrite (supervisor of abbots). Paul probably came out of the monastic complex of Qenneshre. (Note: That monks from Qenneshre had gone into exile by the 620s is proved by the reference to 20 such monks killed in the Slavic attack on Crete in 623.) A scribal notation in a manuscript dated to 675, refers to a Syriac version of the Gloria in excelsis of Athanasius of Alexandria as "translated by Paul, according to the tradition of Qenneshre".

In 623 or 624, during his time on Cyprus, Paul revised an earlier translation of the complete Discourses of Gregory of Nazianzus and the Commentaries of Pseudo-Nonnos. His edition survives in its entirety. On Cyprus, he also translated a collection of 295 hymns (maʿnyoto, antiphons) by Severus of Antioch, John bar Aphtonia, John Psaltes and others. This translation, made between 619 and 629, was revised by Jacob of Edessa in 675 to make it more literal. According to Jacob's note of explanation, the hymns were "translated from the Greek tongue into the Edessene or Syriac speech by the saintly Mar Paul who was bishop of the city of Edessa, while he was in the island of Cyprus, in flight from the Persians"

Paul may also be the translator of the famous pericope in the Gospel of John (7:50–8:12) concerning the woman taken in adultery, which is not found in the earliest Syriac New Testament manuscripts of the Peshitta and Ḥarqlean versions. It was attributed to a certain "Abbas Pawla" (Abbot Paul), which is generally assumed to be Paul of Edessa, although Paul of Tella, a contemporary and also an exile from the Sasanian invasion, has been suggested.

At least one Syriac Orthodox liturgical calendar commemorates Paul on 23 August as "Paul, bishop of Edessa, who translated the books".

== Sources ==
- Brock, Sebastian P. (1971). The Syriac Version of the Pseudo-Nonnos Mythological Scholia. Cambridge University Press.
- Brock, Sebastian P. (2011). "Pawla of Edessa". In Sebastian P. Brock; Aaron M. Butts; George A. Kiraz; Lucas Van Rompay (eds.). Gorgias Encyclopedic Dictionary of the Syriac Heritage: Electronic Edition. Gorgias Press.
- Brooks, Ernest W., ed. (1909). James of Edessa: The Hymns of Severus of Antioch and Others, I. Patrologia Orientalis. Vol. 6. Paris: Firmin Didot.
- Brooks, Ernest W., ed. (1911). James of Edessa: The Hymns of Severus of Antioch and Others, II. Patrologia Orientalis. Vol. 7. Paris: Firmin Didot.
- Jullien, Christelle; Nicholson, Oliver (2018). "Paul of Edessa (d. after 623/4)". In Oliver Nicholson (ed.). The Oxford Dictionary of Late Antiquity. Vol. 2. Oxford University Press. p. 1151.
- Tannous, Jack (2013). "You Are What You Read: Qenneshre and the Miaphysite Church in the Seventh Century". In Philip Wood (ed.). History and Identity in the Late Antique Near East. Oxford University Press. pp. 83–102.
- Tannous, Jack B. (2018). The Making of the Medieval Middle East: Religion, Society, and Simple Believers. Princeton University Press.
