= Qenneshre =

Coordinates: 36.83°N 38.03°E

Qenneshre (also Qēnneshrē or Qennešre, Syriac for "eagle's nest"; Arabic Qinnisrī) was a large West Syriac monastery between the 6th and 13th centuries. It was a centre for the study of ancient Greek literature and the Greek Fathers, and through its Syriac translations it transmitted Greek works to the Islamic world. It was "the most important intellectual centre of the Syriac Orthodox ... from the 6th to the early 9th century", when it was sacked and went into decline.

== Location ==
Qenneshre was in the region of Upper Mesopotamia. According to Yāqūt, it was four parasangs from Mabbug and seven from Serugh.

In the 1990s, Spanish archaeologists discovered a large monastic site on the western bank of the Euphrates River near its confluence with the Sajur. They identified it as Qenneshre. In 2005–2006, however, the Syrian archaeologist Yousef al-Dabte excavated a monastic site on the eastern bank of the Euphrates across from Jirbās (ancient Europos), identifying it with Qenneshre. The latter identification is more likely.

== History ==
The monastery was founded around 530 by John bar Aphtonia, abbot of the monastery of Saint Thomas near Seleucia Pieria, who led some monks away to found a new house in the face of the anti-miaphysite policy of Emperor Justin I. John's second house may have been originally dedicated to Saint Thomas as well. It is not clear if it is the "monastery of Beth Aphtonia" referred to in some Syriac sources. The new monastery's emphasis on Greek studies was inherited from Seleucia Pieria. In its heyday, which lasted until the 9th century, Qenneshre had about 370 resident monks.

The hymnist John Psaltes was the abbot of Qenneshre late in the 6th century. In 623, according to the Chronicle of 640, the Slavs raided the island of Crete and captured some monks of Qenneshre, killing twenty of them in the process. These were probably exiles who had fled the Persian invasion of Mesopotamia in 602.

Sometime after 809, probably around 811, Qenneshre was sacked and burned by renegade Arabs, probably under the leadership of Naṣr ibn Shabath al-ʿUqaylī. Around 820, Patriarch Dionysios of Tel Maḥre, a former monk of Qenneshre, received permission to rebuild the monastery from ʿUthmān, son of Thumāma ibn al-Walīd, who had succeeded his father as the effectively autonomous local leader in the midst of the civil war that followed the death of the Caliph Hārūn al-Rashīd in 809. Qenneshre never regained its previous stature.

Qenneshre was still prominent enough to be visited by bishops in the 10th century. In the reign of Emir Sayf al-Dawla (died 967), it was a major destination for tourists from Mabbug, according to Ibn al-ʿAdīm, writing in the 13th century. When the monastery was abandoned is not entirely clear, but archaeological evidence suggests it was still inhabited in the early 13th century.

== Centre of Greek learning ==
The bilingual culture of the monastery has labelled Graeco-Syriac or Syro-Hellenic. Other monasteries of the West Syriac tradition with the same bilingual culture include Mar Mattai, Mar Zakay, Mar Saba, Saint Catherine's and the Black Mountain.

Both secular and religious works were translated from Greek into Syriac by the monks of Qenneshre and those they trained. Tumo of Ḥarqel, Patriarch Athanasios II and Yaʿqub of Edessa are all known to have studied Greek at Qenneshre, as probably did Severos Sebokht and George, bishop of the Arabs, and possibly Phocas of Edessa. The translator Pawla of Edessa worked "according to the tradition of Qenneshre", as a note in a manuscript of his translations of Severus of Antioch relates. There is as of yet no scholarly study of the manner and techniques of the Qenneshre school of translation. The translation and re-translation of biblical, patristic and secular philosophical texts suggests a distinct "miaphysite curriculum of study" crafted and promoted at Qenneshre.

Among the works translated at Qenneshre or by monks from Qenneshre are the Homilies of Gregory of Nazianzus by Paul of Edessa in 623–624; the hymns of Severus of Antioch also by Paul and later revised by Yaʿqub of Edessa; Basil of Caesarea's Hexaemeron by Athanasios; Aristotle's Prior Analytics, Posterior Analytics, Topics and Sophistical Refutations by Athanasios II; Aristotle's Categories by Yaʿqub in the early 8th century; and Aristotle's On Interpretation by George, bishop of the Arabs, who also re-translated the Prior Analytics, in both cases adding his own introduction and commentary. The entire Organon (Aristotle's collected works on logic) was available in Syriac by the death of Athanasios II in 684.

The monks of Qenneshre, as well as those of Qartmin, maintained kept a record of important events in the form of regularly updated annals. These annals served as a source for the 6th-century Chronicle of Edessa and the 7th-century Chronicle of 724. According to Dionysios of Tel Maḥre, Yaʿqub of Edessa and John the Stylite "charted the succession of years" in the manner of Eusebius of Caesarea.

Qenneshre supplied several bishops and seven patriarchs of Antioch. Besides the aforementioned Dionysios and Athanasios II, Patriarchs Julian I, Athanasios I, Theodore, Julian II, George I were monks from Qenneshre. The 13th-century historian Bar Hebraeus specifically notes that these patriarchs learned Greek at Qenneshre. For part of the 7th century, according to the biography of Theodota of Amida (died 698), the patriarchs of Antioch even resided at Qenneshre. Severos Sebokht is called a "bishop of Qenneshrin" by Bar Hebraeus, which may indicate that he was the bishop of Chalcis or perhaps even that Qenneshre had a bishop for a short time.
