= Julian I =

Julian I may refer to:

- Didius Julianus, Roman emperor in 193
- Julian (Chalcedonian patriarch of Antioch), bishop in 471–476
- Julian I (Miaphysite patriarch of Antioch), bishop in 591–595
