= Domitian of Melitene =

Byzantine Archbishop

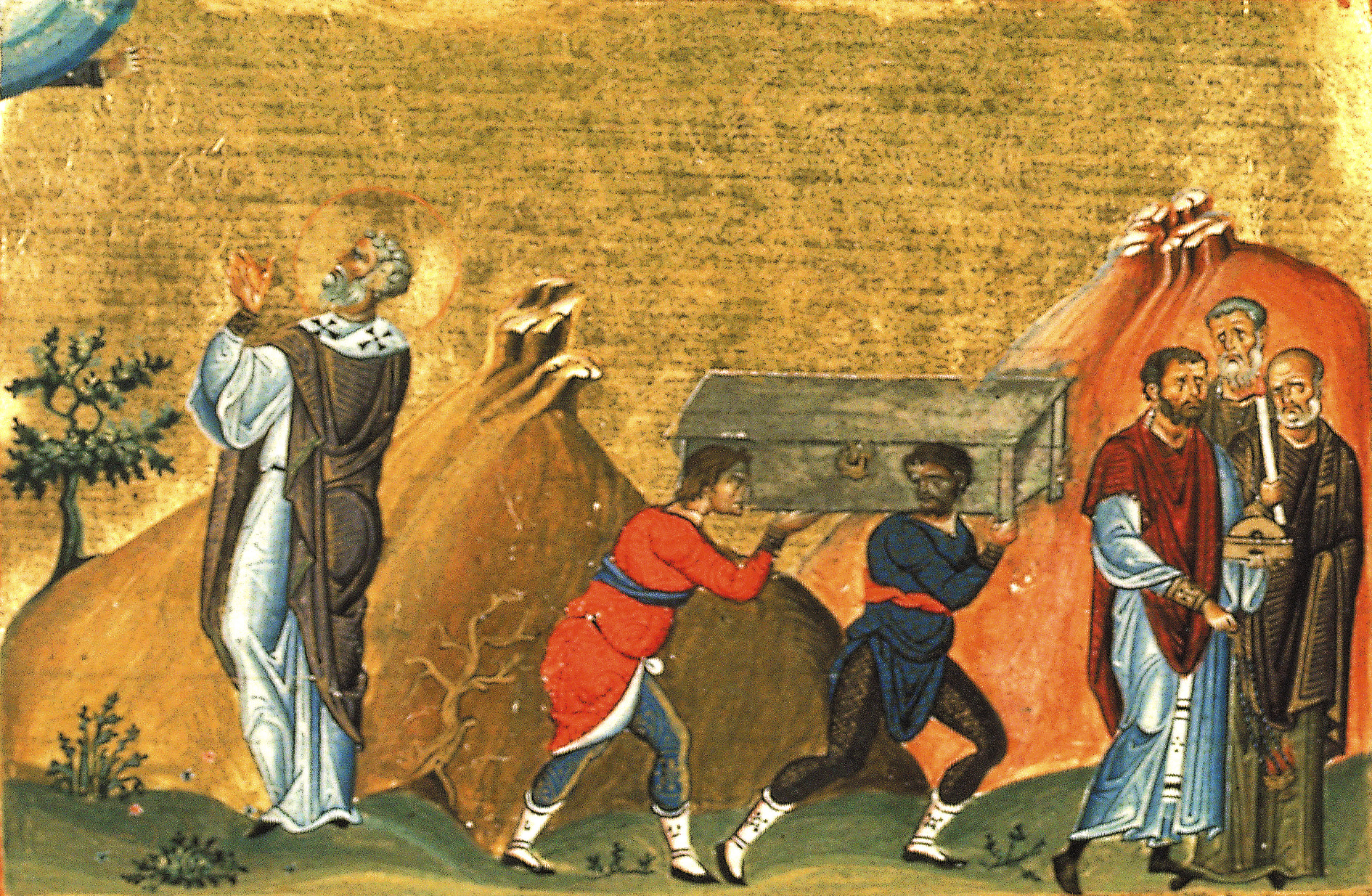
The burial of Domitian, from the Menologion of Basil II (11th century)

Domitian (Latin: Domitianus, Greek: Δομιτιανός; c. 550 – 602) was the nephew of the Roman emperor Maurice and the archbishop of Melitene in Roman Armenia from around 580 until his death. He was renowned as a diplomat and is regarded as a saint by the Chalcedonian churches for enforcing orthodoxy in the northeast of the empire. He unsuccessfully tried to convert the Persian king Khosrow II to Christianity when he helped restore him to his throne in 590–591. In the monophysite tradition, however, he is remembered for his brutal persecutions.

== Early life ==
Domitian is the subject of a short biography in the Synaxarion of Constantinople and another, probably sourced from the Synaxarion, in the 11th-century Menologion of Basil II. These were written centuries after his death and their reliability is suspect. According to the Synaxarion, he was thirty years old when he became bishop, and this fact may be accurate. This would place his birth around 550. He was certainly young at the time of his appointment.

According to the Chronicle of 1234 and Michael the Syrian, Domitian was the son of Maurice's brother Peter. John of Nikiu says the same in one passage, but elsewhere contradicts himself by making him Maurice's cousin, the son of his paternal uncle. Many other sources—e.g. Evagrius Scholasticus, Theophylact Simocatta, Nicephorus Callistus—describe him as a relative without specifying further. The Synaxarion names his father as Theodore and his mother as Ecdicia, describing them as pious and wealthy. No brother of Maurice named Theodore is otherwise known, and it may be accepted that his father was Peter.

According to the Synaxarion, Domitian received both a secular and a biblical education. He befriended the future Pope Gregory the Great when the latter was an apocrisiarius in Constantinople between 579 and 585. They apparently studied the Bible together. According to the Synaxarion, Domitian married, but his wife died not long after their marriage. Thereupon he renounced the world. He became renowned for his combination of sagacity and asceticism.

== Maurice's advisor ==
According to John of Ephesus's Historia Ecclesiastica, Maurice arranged his election as bishop of Melitene about two years before he succeeded to the imperial throne, while he was still just magister militum per Orientem (578–582). This would be around 580. The bishops of Melitene were metropolitans of their province, but Domitian was the first to be accorded the rank of archbishop. Although in administrative terms, Melitene was a part of Armenia, it was often considered to belong to Cappadocia. To honour Domitian, Maurice raised the rank of his province from Armenia Tertia to Armenia Prima.

John of Ephesus says that Domitian moved to Constantinople soon after Maurice's accession. He became one of Maurice's closest and most trusted advisors in the wars against the Persians and against the Avars and Slavs. The monophysite John, who died before Domitian's persecution of the monophysites, considered him wise. In religion, John says he was "thoroughly imbued with the opinions of" the Council of Chalcedon and Leo's Tome. He reportedly gave the gifts he received from the emperor to the poor.

Domitian mainly resided in Constantinople in the periods 582–585 and 591–598. According to the Synaxarion, Maurice sent him on several missions to various pagan tribes. In 587 or 588, King Childebert II of Austrasia wrote to him seeking a peace treaty with the Romans. This letter is preserved in the collection known as the Epistulae Austrasicae.

In the testament that Maurice had drawn up in 596 or 597, which was only discovered in the reign of Heraclius, Domitian was named guardian of the emperor's children.

== Persian mission ==
In 590, during a Persian civil war, he was sent with Bishop Gregory of Antioch to Constantina to join the exiled Persian king Khosrow II, whom Maurice intended to restore. He and Gregory were seemingly chosen with the intention of converting Khosrow to Christianity. In August 593, Domitian wrote to his old friend Gregory the Great, now pope, informing him about his efforts. He apparently told him he should "recognize the size of the statue", referring to Maurice, "from the shadow". The letter is lost. Gregory the Great wrote back to Domitian praising him for having "preached the Christian faith" to the Persian king. Gregory wrote at least two more letters to Domitian (1 June 595 and September or October 598). The last is concerned mainly with ecclesiastical affairs on Sicily.

It was probably during his sojourn with the Persian court in exile that Domitian met the Christian noblewoman Golinduch, either at Circesium or Hierapolis. He was the main source for Eustratius of Melitene's biography of the saintly woman, written after his death and before that of Maurice (27 November 602). He is also mentioned in the Synaxarion's biography of Golinduch, who died on 13 July 591. According to her Georgian biography, she met Domitian at Hierapolis while he was on his way to the court of Hormizd IV, possibly as early as 587, and dissuaded him from continuing by prophesying that Hormizd would soon be overthrown.

Domitian took the surrender of the Persian garrison occupying Martyropolis, and punished for treason those who had surrendered the city to the Persians. At Martyropolis, he delivered a speech which was recorded by Theophylact Simocatta. He accompanied Khosrow and the Roman army under Narses as far as Mardin in 591. According to Theophylact, when Khosrow offended the inhabitants of Dara by his behaviour in a church, Domitian withdrew the Roman army to Constantia until Khosrow made obeisance to him. At Ammodium, he gave a speech to the troops—recorded in full by Theophylact—and then returned to Roman territory. He did not continue on to the Persian capital. He negotiated a treaty of friendship with Persia. According to the Synaxarion, Khosrow gave him money, which he used to build churches and hospitals.

== Spiritual authority ==
Domitian was de facto the highest spiritual authority in the empire under Maurice. The Chalcedonian patriarch Eulogius of Alexandria dedicated his treatise on Leo's Tome to Domitian. According to Photios, Domitian reproved him for using the miaphysite formula "one nature of God the Word made flesh" of Cyril of Alexandria, although Eulogius protested his innocent intention, in the process demonstrating Domitian's standing.

Domitian was one of the bishops who took part in the consecration of Patriarch Cyriacus II of Constantinople. In October 596, Gregory the Great reproved the bishops, including Domitian, for misusing Psalm 118:24.

According to John of Nikiu, Domitian "gave order that force should be used to compel the Jews and Samaritans to be baptized and become Christians," but this project only resulted in false Christians.

== Persecution of monophysites ==
In 598 or 599, Maurice authorized Domitian to persecute the monophysites in the vicinity of Melitene. According to Michael the Syrian, this was "provoked" by Domitian, "who was gnawed by jealousy on account of the conversions" to monophysitism in Melitene and its environs. According to the Chronicle of 1234, which draws on the lost chronicle of Dionysios of Tel Maḥre, the persecution was Maurice's idea and he "summoned" Domitian to authorize him to persecute the "followers of Severus", i.e., of Severus of Antioch. Modern scholars have differed in their estimation of the severity of the persecution. In John of Nikiu's words, Domitian "forced heretics to be enrolled in the ranks of the church." According to the Chronicle of 819, he "forc[ed] them to receive communion from him." The Chronicle of 1234 and Michael the Syrian, both drawing on Dionysius, paint a darker picture. They write that 400 monks of the "monastery of the orientals" in Edessa who resisted Domitian were killed. The Chronicle of 1234 directly implicates Domitian:

When he had arrived in Mesopotamia and had set the persecution in motion, he came to Edessa and began to exercise great pressure on the Orthodox [monophysites]. He summoned the monks from the Abbey of the Orientals and did his utmost to deflect them from Orthodoxy by playing on their emotions, but they would have nothing of it. He tried threats instead, but they were impervious to fear. So then he ordered the commander of the troops whom the King had sent with him, whose name was Sakellarios, to take them out to the ditch outside the southern gate, which was called the Bēth Shemesh [House of the Sun] Gate and he slaughtered them all in a single pool of blood. In number they were four hundred men.

Michael the Syrian, however, lays the blame on the commander:

[Domitian] departed like a beast of prey for Mesopotamia. . . [T]hat wicked man, he continued his persecutions for a long time, putting the Orthodox under pressure to receive communion from him even after they had eaten. Many of the Orthodox stood their ground sturdily in this combat and did not consent to accept the evil heresy of the Dyophysites [Chalcedonians]. They reviled the King [Maurice] and Domitian, and the soldier called [the s]patharios used this as a pretext, saying that he had heard the monks insulting the King and his nephew and that he had killed them for this reason. Many people were expelled from their churches.

The Narratio de rebus Armeniae supports this picture of a brutal crackdown. Monophysite sources—the Chronicle of 724, the Chronicle of 1234, Michael the Syrian and Bar Hebraeus—are universally hostile to Domitian, accusing him of seizing all their churches in northern Mesopotamia and Syria. He deposed Thomas of Harqel from the see of Mabbug and Paul from Constantia, forcing them into exile in the monastery of the Antonini in the Enaton. The effects of this persecution were reversed when Khosrow captured Edessa in 609: the Chalcedonian bishops were expelled and the monophysites returned.

== Death and veneration ==
According to Theophanes the Confessor, Domitian died on 12 January 602 and was buried in the Church of the Holy Apostles in Constantinople. His funeral was attended by the entire Senate. According to the Synaxarion, his body was later transferred to Melitene. If this is accurate, it must have taken place during the reign of Heraclius.

Other sources give his date of death as 10 January and that is the day of his celebration in the Chalcedonian churches, who regard him as a saint. He is in the revised Roman Martyrology (2004), but not in the General Roman Calendar.
