= Dionysius bar Salibi =

Syriac Orthodox Church bishop and scholar (died 1171)

Dionysius bar Salibi (died 1171) was a Syriac Orthodox writer and bishop, who served as metropolitan of Amid, in Upper Mesopotamia, from 1166 to 1171. He was one of the most prominent and prolific writers within the Syriac Orthodox Church during the twelfth century.

He was a native of Melitene, on the upper Euphrates. His baptismal name was Jacob. He assumed name 'Dionysius' upon consecration to the episcopate. In 1154, he was ordained bishop of Marash by the patriarch Athanasius VII bar Qatra; a year later the diocese of Mabbug was added to his charge. In 1166, new patriarch Michael the Great, the successor of Athanasius, transferred him to the metropolitan see of Amid in Mesopotamia, and there he remained until his death in 1171.

Of his writings probably the most important are his exhaustive commentaries on the text of the Old and New Testaments, in which he skillfully interwove and summarized the interpretations of previous writers such as Ephrem the Syrian, Chrysostom, Cyril of Alexandria, Moses Bar-Kepha and John of Dara, whom he mentions together in the preface to his commentary on St Matthew. Among his other main works are a treatise against heretics, containing inter alia a polemic against the Jews and the Muslims; liturgical treatises, epistles and homilies.

His polemical works also include treatises on Melkites, and Armenians.

== Translations ==
- Dionysius Bar Ṣalībī: A Response to the Arabs, translated by Joseph P. Amar (CSCO, Vol. 615; Louvain: Peeters, 2005). ISBN 978-90-429-1568-8.
- The Work of Dionysius Bar Salībi Against the Armenians, edited and translated by Alphonse Mingana (Piscataway: Gorgias Press, 2009).
- The Commentary of Dionysius Bar Salibi on the Eucharist, translated and annotated by Baby Varghese (Piscataway: Gorgias Press, 2011). ISBN 978-1-61719-404-7.
- Dionysius Bar Salibi: Commentary on Myron and Baptism, translated with introduction by Baby Varghese (Piscataway: Gorgias Press, 2012).
- Dionysius Bar Ṣalībī’s Treatise Against the Jews: Edited and Translated with Notes and Commentary, edited by Rifaat Ebied, Malki Malki, and Lionel R. Wickham (Leiden: Brill, 2020). ISBN 978-90-04-39147-5.

== See also ==
- Alogi
- Syriac literature
- Dioceses of the Syriac Orthodox Church

== Sources ==
- McLean, Norman (1911). "Bar-Ṣalībī, Jacob" . In Chisholm, Hugh (ed.). Encyclopædia Britannica. Vol. 3 (11th ed.). Cambridge University Press. p. 446. This article incorporates text from this source, which is in the public domain.
- Brock, Sebastian P. (1989). "Three Thousand Years of Aramaic Literature". ARAM Periodical. 1 (1): 11–23.
- Bundy, David (1993). "The Genesis Commentary of Dionysius Bar Salibi". Studia Patristica. 25: 244–252. ISBN 978-90-6831-519-6.
- Ebied, Rifaat Y.; Malki, Malatius M.; Wickham, Lionel R., eds. (2020). Dionysius Bar Ṣalībī's Treatise Against the Jews: Edited and Translated with Notes and Commentary. Leiden: Brill. ISBN 978-90-04-39147-5.
- Fiey, Jean Maurice (1993). Pour un Oriens Christianus Novus: Répertoire des diocèses syriaques orientaux et occidentaux. Beirut: Orient-Institut. ISBN 978-3-515-05718-9.
- Griffith, Sidney H. (1987). "Dionysius bar Salibi on the Muslims". IV Symposium Syriacum 1984. Roma: Pontificium Institutum Studiorum Orientalium. pp. 353–365.
- Mingana, Alphonse; Harris, James Rendel (1927). "Woodbrooke Studies: Editions and Translations of Christian Documents in Syriac and Garshūni" (PDF). Bulletin of the John Rylands Library. 11 (1): 110–231. doi:10.7227/BJRL.11.1.8.
- Mingana, Alphonse (1931). "Woodbrooke Studies: Christian Documents in Syriac, Arabic, and Garshūni, Edited and Translated with a Critical Apparatus" (PDF). Bulletin of the John Rylands Library. 15 (2): 489–600. doi:10.7227/BJRL.15.2.9.
- Rabo, Gabriel (2015). "Dionysius Jacob Bar Ṣalibi's Confession of the Syrian Orthodox Faith" (PDF). Hekamtho: Syrian Orthodox Theological Journal. 1 (1): 20–39.
- Teule, Herman G. B. (2009). "Reflections on Identity: The Suryoye of the Twelfth and Thirteenth Centuries: Bar Salibi, Bar Shakko, and Barhebraeus". Church History and Religious Culture. 89 (1–3): 179–189. doi:10.1163/187124109X407899.
