= John bar Aphtonia =

Syriac monk, c.480–537

John bar Aphtonia (c.480–537) was a Syriac monk of the Miaphysite persuasion who founded around 530 the monastery of Saint Thomas in Qenneshre ("Eagle's Nest"), located on the eastern side of the Euphrates in present northern Syria. A key figure in the transmission of Greek thought and literary culture into a Syriac milieu, his monastery became the intellectual centre of the West Syriac world for the next three centuries.

John was born in Edessa and raised by his mother, Aphtonia. (His surname means "son of Aphtonia".) His father was a rhetor, that is, a lawyer. According to Pseudo-Zacharias Rhetor, John was also a former lawyer, but this is uncertain. John himself was bilingual in both the Syriac language and Greek. At the age of fifteen he was sent to the monastery of Saint Thomas in Seleucia Pieria near Antioch. Sometime between 528 and 531, he left with several other Miaphysite-leaning monks facing persecution from the pro-Chalcedonian imperial authorities. They established the monastery of Qenneshre on the banks of the Euphrates near Jarabulus and elected John as their first abbot. According to the historian Zacharias Rhetor, John was part of the Miaphysite delegation that negotiated with the Emperor Justinian I in Constantinople around 531.

A Syriac biography of John was written after his death by a monk of Qenneshre. John himself wrote in both Greek and Syriac. Among his surviving works are hymns; a commentary on the Song of Songs, which survives only in excerpts in catenae; and a biography of Severus of Antioch. His Greek hymns were often associated with the hymns of Severus. They were translated into Syriac a century later by Paul of Edessa, another monk of Qenneshre.

== Bibliography ==
- Brock, Sebastian P. (1981). "The Conversation with the Syrian Orthodox under Justinian (532)". Orientalia Christiana Periodica. 47: 87–121.
- Childers, Jeff W. (2011). "John bar Aphtonia (d. 537)". In Sebastian P. Brock; Aaron M. Butts; George A. Kiraz; Lucas Van Rompay (eds.). Gorgias Encyclopedic Dictionary of the Syriac Heritage: Electronic Edition. Gorgias Press.
- Greatrex, Geoffrey, ed. (2011). The Chronicle of Pseudo-Zachariah Rhetor. Church and War in Late Antiquity. Translated Texts for Historians. Vol. 55. Liverpool University Press. ISBN 9781846314940.
- Krausmüller, Dirk (2013). "God as Impersonator of Saints in Late Antique Hagiography: The Case of the Life of John bar Aphtonia († 537)". Mukaddime. 7: 23–45.
- Menze, Volker L. (2008). Justinian and the Making of the Syrian Orthodox Church. Oxford University Press.
- Nau, François (1902). "Histoire de Jean bar Aphtonia". Revue de l'Orient chrétien. 7: 97–135.
- Tannous, Jack B. (2018). "Qenneshre, monastery of". In Oliver Nicholson (ed.). The Oxford Dictionary of Late Antiquity. Vol. 2. Oxford University Press. p. 1255.
- Watt, John W. (1999). "A Portrait of John bar Aphtonia, Founder of the Monastery of Qenneshre". In J. W. Drijvers; J. W. Watt (eds.). Portraits of Spiritual Authority: Religious Power in Early Christianity, Byzantium and the Christian Orient. Brill. pp. 155–169.
- Watt, John W. (2018). "John bar Aphtonia". In Nicholson, Oliver (ed.). The Oxford Dictionary of Late Antiquity, Volume 2: J–Z. Oxford: Oxford University Press. pp. 819–820. ISBN 978-0-19-881625-6.
