= Pseudo-Nonnus =

Pseudo-Nonnus, also called Nonnus Abbas (i.e. "Nonnus the Abbot"), was a 6th-century commentator on Gregory of Nazianzus. His Commentaries consist of scholia explaining the meaning of Gregory's many allusions to Greek mythology. It was written in Greek and translated into Syriac, Armenian and Georgian. The earliest complete text is the Syriac translation of Paul of Edessa from 623 or 624. There are illustrated manuscripts of the Commentaries.
