= John the Stylite =

John the Stylite, (Note: Syriac Yuḥanon Esṭunoyo or Estōnājā.) also known as John of Litharb (Note: Also spelled Litarb (Līṯārb) or Litarba, from Syriac LYTʾRB or LYTRYB. It is usually identified with Atarib.) (died c. 737/738), was a Syriac Orthodox monk and author. He was a stylite attached to the monastery of Atarib and part of a circle of Syriac intellectuals active in northern Syria under the Umayyad dynasty.

Few of John's writings have survived. Although he maintained a correspondence with Jacob of Edessa (died 708) and George, bishop of the Arabs (died 724), his only surviving letter is fragmentary and unpublished (as of 2011). It is addressed to an Arab priest, Daniel Ṭuʿoyo, and concerns the prophecy in Genesis 49:10. He also wrote a history with a strong chronographical focus, apparently as a continuation of the chronicle of Jacob of Edessa that ended in 692, which itself was a continuation of the 4th-century Chronicle of Eusebius. John took the history down to the Council of Manzikert in the year 726. It has not survived, however, although it is referenced and in a few places quoted by Dionysius of Tel Maḥre and Michael the Syrian. Dionysius' comments suggest that John did not exactly follow the format of Eusebius or Jacob. Other evidence suggests that John corrected Jacob's chronology of Muḥammad by giving him a reign of ten years (622–632). John wrote a treatise on the soul which was copied in its entirety into a like treatise by John of Dara a century later.

It is a matter of debate whether the "John the Stylite in the monastery of Mār Zʿurā at Sarug" (Note: Or "Yuḥanon Esṭunoyo in the Monastery of Mor Zʿuro near Serugh".) who wrote a short grammatical treatise and a disputation is to be identified with John the Stylite of Litharb. The monastery of Mār Zʿurā at Sarug is mentioned by Michael the Syrian in the 12th century. In favour of the identity is the fact that the grammatical treatise is dependent on Jacob of Edessa's grammar; (Note: It also relies on the 5th-century grammarian Joseph Hūzāyā and the Syriac translation of Dionysius Thrax.) against it that it is preserved only in a Nestorian manuscript. The disputation (Note: In the manuscript, titled Qallīl men mamllā d-mār(y) Yūḥannā esṭonāyā d-bēt mār(y) Zʿurā qaddishā d-ba-Srug (Part of the discourse of Mār John the Stylite of Mār Zʿurā in Sarug).) likewise survives only in the form of a Maronite summary. It is written as a theological dispute between John and a non-Christian (possibly Muslim) opponent. Harald Suermann argues for parallels between the disputation and a letter of Jacob of Edessa to John of Litharb. Carl Anton Baumstark did not accept it as a work of the stylite of Litharb, but he did accept the grammatical treatise. Robert Hoyland considers there to be two distinct men.

Although his own writings are largely lost, something of John's intellect and education can be gathered from the surviving eleven letters of Jacob of Edessa and four of George addressed to him. They show a circle of intellectuals discussing a broad variety of topics: chronology, history, philosophy, astronomy, literary criticism and biblical exegesis. John was a younger contemporary of Jacob and his death is usually placed in 737 or 738.

== Bibliography ==
- Barsoum, Ignatius Aphram (2003). The Scattered Pearls: A History of Syriac Literature and Sciences. Translated by Matti Moosa (2nd revised ed.). Gorgias Press.
- Hoyland, Robert G. (1997). Seeing Islam As Others Saw It: A Survey and Evaluation of Christian, Jewish and Zoroastrian Writings on Early Islam. Darwin Press.
- Palmer, Andrew (1993). The Seventh Century in the West-Syrian Chronicles. Liverpool University Press.
- Peña, Ignace; Castellana, Pascal; Fernandez, Romuald (1975). Les Stylites syriens. Milan: Studium Biblicum Franciscanum.
- Suermann, Harald [in German] (2008). "John the Stylite of Mār Zʿurā at Sarug". In David Thomas; Barbara Roggema (eds.). Christian–Muslim Relations: A Bibliographical History. Vol. 1 (600–900). Brill. pp. 314–315.
- Tannous, Jack B. (2018). "John of Litharb". In Oliver Nicholson (ed.). The Oxford Dictionary of Late Antiquity. Vol. 2. Oxford University Press. p. 830. ISBN 978-0-19-866277-8.
- Van Rompay, Lucas (2018) [2011]. "Yuḥanon of Litarba". In Sebastian P. Brock; Aaron M. Butts; George A. Kiraz; Lucas Van Rompay (eds.). Gorgias Encyclopedic Dictionary of the Syriac Heritage: Electronic Edition. Beth Mardutho [Gorgias Press].
