= Paul of Tella =

Syriac Orthodox bishop of Tella

Paul, in Syriac Pawlos (fl. early 7th century), was the Syriac Orthodox bishop of Tella and an important translator of Greek works into Syriac.

Paul was a native of Tella. By 615 he was a bishop. At some point before 613, he fled Syria for Egypt. Possibly he was one of several non-Chalcedonian bishops who fled in 599 amidst the persecution of Domitian of Melitene, nephew of the Emperor Maurice. He is not named by Michael the Syrian among the exiles, but the bishop of Tella is said to have returned to diocese when the persecution ceased. If this was Paul, then he fled a second time to Egypt during the Persian invasion of Syria in 609–611.

In Egypt, Paul lived in the Enaton, a group of monasteries near Alexandria. There he joined with other Syriac scholars, including Tumo of Ḥarqel, to translate Greek texts into Syriac. Working between 613 and 617, Paul was primarily responsible for the Syro-Hexapla, a Syriac translation of Septuagint, the Greek translation of the Old Testament, based on the version found in Origen's Hexapla. He also translated a liturgy for baptism by Severus of Antioch. His translation work is characterised by close imitation of the Greek morphology, syntax and word order.

Paul of Tella is sometimes proposed as the translator of the pericope about Jesus and the woman taken in adultery, which is found in neither the later standard Syriac Bible, the Peshitta, nor in Tumo of Ḥarqel's translation of the New Testament, the Ḥarqlean Version. It is attributed to a certain "Abbas Pawla" in the manuscripts, but this is probably Paul of Edessa.

Besides his translations, Paul wrote at least one surviving sedro (a type of long prayer).

There is some question over whether the bishop of Tella named Paul and the translator of the Septuagint of the same name are the same person. The translator is sometimes instead identified with Paul of Nisibis.

== Sources ==
- Jullien, Florence (2018). "Paul of Tella". In Nicholson, Oliver (ed.). The Oxford Dictionary of Late Antiquity. Oxford: Oxford University Press. p. 1151. ISBN 978-0-19-866277-8.
- Van Rompay, Lucas (2011). "Pawlos of Tella". In Sebastian P. Brock; Aaron M. Butts; George A. Kiraz; Lucas Van Rompay (eds.). Gorgias Encyclopedic Dictionary of the Syriac Heritage: Electronic Edition. Gorgias Press.
