= Tell Ada =

Tell Ada تل عدا Tell Ady
- Village
- Location in Syria
- Coordinates: 35°5′57″N 37°5′34″E
- Country: Syria
- Governorate: Hama
- District: Salamiyah
- Subdistrict: Salamiyah

Population (2004)
  - Total: 1,597
- Time zone: UTC+3 (AST)
- City Qrya Pcode: C3221

Tell Ada (Arabic: تل عدا, romanized: Tall ʿAdā) is a Syrian village located in the Salamiyah Subdistrict in Salamiyah District. According to the Syria Central Bureau of Statistics (CBS), Tell Ada had a population of 1,597 in the 2004 census. Its inhabitants are predominantly Circassians.
