= Dionysius I Telmaharoyo =

54th Patriarch of Syriac Orthodox Church of Antioch (818-845)

- Syriac Orthodox Patriarch of Antioch and All the East
- Church: Syriac Orthodox Church
- See: Antioch
- Installed: 818
- Term ended: 845
- Predecessor: Quriaqos of Tagrit
- Successor: John IV

Personal details
- Born: Tal Mahre
- Died: 22 August 845

Dionysius I Telmaharoyo (Latin: Dionysius Telmaharensis, Syriac: ܕܝܘܢܢܘܣܝܘܣ ܬܠܡܚܪܝܐ, Arabic: مار ديونيسيوس التلمحري), also known as Dionysius of Tel Mahre, was the Patriarch of Antioch, and head of the Syriac Orthodox Church from 818 until his death in 845.

== Biography ==
Dionysius was born in Tal Mahre, near the city of Raqqa, into a wealthy family from Edessa, and became a monk at the Monastery of Qenneshre, where he studied philology, jurisprudence, philosophy, and theology. He also studied at the Monastery of Mar Jacob at Kayshum. In 818, Dionysius was elected Patriarch of Antioch unanimously by a synod of forty-eight bishops. After his consecration, he issued a proclamation and held three councils in Raqqa in the same year, at which he issued twelve canons. Dionysius restored the Monastery of Qenneshre in 822 after it was damaged by fire caused by dissenters.

In 826, Dionysius visited Egypt in the company of the Abbasid general Abdallah ibn Tahir al-Khurasani. He later held a council at the Monastery of Euspholis in 828, and returned to Egypt in 832 in the company of Caliph Al-Ma'mun. Whilst in Egypt, Dionysius met with Pope Jacob of Alexandria, head of the Coptic Orthodox Church, a fellow miaphysite church, and several Coptic Orthodox bishops outside of the city of Tannis. He held another council at the city of Tagrit in 834, and met with Al-Ma'mun in Baghdad, and also his successor, Caliph Al-Mu'tasim. A total of one hundred bishops were ordained by Dionysius during his tenure and he served as patriarch until his death on 22 August 845.

== Works ==
At the request of John, Bishop of Dara, Dionysius composed the Annals, a two volume history of the church and secular events from the coronation of the Roman Emperor Maurice in 582 to the death of the Roman Emperor Theophilus in 843. One volume was dedicated to church history whilst the other covered secular history, and each volume was divided into eight books. The work was composed with use of citations of the works of Theophilus of Edessa, an 8th-century scholar. The Annals were cited extensively by Michael I, Syriac Orthodox Patriarch of Antioch (r. 1166–1199), and the anonymous author of the Chronicle of 1234. Dionysius' accounts were also later used in the Ecclesiastical History of Bar Hebraeus, Maphrian of the East (r. 1266–1286).

The Chronicle of Zuqnin was erroneously ascribed to Dionysius by Giuseppe Simone Assemani, but this has since been disregarded.

== Bibliography ==
- Barsoum, Ignatius Aphrem (2003). The Scattered Pearls: A History of Syriac Literature and Sciences, trans. Matti Moosa, 2nd rev. ed. Gorgias Press. Archived from the original on 2022-10-18.
- Hoyland, Robert G. (1997). Seeing Islam as Others Saw It: A Survey and Evaluation of Christian, Jewish and Zoroastrian Writings on Early Islam. Darwin Press.
- Swanson, Mark N. (2010). The Coptic Papacy in Islamic Egypt (641–1517). American University in Cairo Press. ISBN 9789774160936.

Preceded by Quriaqos of Tagrit	Syrian Orthodox Patriarch of Antioch; 818–845	Succeeded by John IV
