= Julian I (Miaphysite patriarch of Antioch) =

41st Patriarch of Syriac Orthodox Church of Antioch

- Syriac Orthodox Patriarch of Antioch and All the East
- Church: Syriac Orthodox Church
- See: Antioch
- Installed: 591
- Term ended: 594/595
- Predecessor: Peter III
- Successor: Athanasius I Gammolo

Personal details
- Died: 9 July 594/595

Sainthood
- Feast day: 9 April; 5 July; 8 July; 9 July; 28 November
- Venerated in: Syriac Orthodox Church

Julian I (Note: Julian is counted as either Julian I as the first Syriac Orthodox Patriarch of Antioch by that name, or Julian II, after Julian (r. 471–475/476).) (Syriac: ܝܘܠܝܢܐ ܩܕܡܝܐ) was the Patriarch of Antioch and head of the Syriac Orthodox Church from 591 until his death in 594/595. He is commemorated as a saint by the Syriac Orthodox Church.

== Biography ==
Julian was born in the 6th century, and became a monk at the Monastery of Qenneshre, where he likely learnt Greek. He served as syncellus (secretary) to Patriarch Peter III, and was elected as his successor as patriarch in 591. It is suggested that Julian was opposed to the doctrine of tritheism, like the Patriarch Peter, and this may have influenced his election. He was consecrated by the bishop John of Tella. Julian served as patriarch until his death on 9 July 594/595.

== Works ==
Julian wrote a commentary on the works of Patriarch Peter III, in which he clarified errors, and responded to misgivings regarding the works expressed by Sergius the Armenian, archbishop of Edessa, and his brother John.

== Bibliography ==
Primary sources

- Michael the Syrian. Chronicle (in French). Vol. III. Translated by Jean-Baptiste Chabot. Paris: Ernest Leroux.

Secondary sources

- Allen, Pauline (2011). "Episcopal Succession in Antioch in the Sixth Century". In Johan Leemans; Peter Van Nuffelen; Shawn W. J. Keough; Carla Nicolaye (eds.). Episcopal Elections in Late Antiquity. Walter de Gruyter GmbH. p. 23-39.
- Barsoum, Ephrem (2003). The Scattered Pearls: A History of Syriac Literature and Sciences. Translated by Matti Moosa (2nd ed.). Gorgias Press.
- Burleson, Samuel; Van Rompay, Lucas (2011). "List of Patriarchs: II. The Syriac Orthodox Church and its Uniate continuations". In Sebastian P. Brock; Aaron M. Butts; George A. Kiraz; Lucas Van Rompay (eds.). Gorgias Encyclopedic Dictionary of the Syriac Heritage: Electronic Edition. Gorgias Press.
- Fiey, Jean Maurice (2004). Lawrence Conrad (ed.). Saints Syriaques (in French). The Darwin Press.
- Tannous, Jack B. (2018). The Making of the Medieval Middle East: Religion, Society, and Simple Believers. Princeton University Press.
- Wilmshurst, David (2019). "West Syrian patriarchs and maphrians". In Daniel King (ed.). The Syriac World. Routledge. pp. 806–813.

Preceded by Peter III	Syriac Orthodox Patriarch of Antioch; 591–595	Succeeded by Athanasius I Gammolo
