= Ernest Walter Brooks =

English ancient historian and Syriac scholar

Brooks in 1939.

Ernest Walter Brooks, FBA (30 August 1863 – 26 March 1955) was an English ancient historian and scholar of Syriac. The son of a priest, he was educated at Eton College (as a King's Scholar) and then at King's College, Cambridge, where he read classics and graduated in 1887. He then lived in London and Geneva (the latter from the late 1920s) as an independent scholar, before retiring to Hampshire in 1941. He became an expert in translating Syriac historical texts into English, gaining a leading reputation. His prolific output in this area was supplemented by research on Byzantine history and contributions to The Cambridge Medieval History (1911–23). Having received an honorary doctorate from the University of Louvain in 1927, he was elected a fellow of the British Academy in 1938 (though he resigned in 1941). His wife, Ellen, was a daughter of Major-General G. B. Mellersh.
