= Thomas of Harqel =

Thomas of Harqel was a miaphysite bishop from the early 7th century. Educated in Greek at the monastery of Qenneshre, he became bishop of Mabbug in Syria. He was deposed as bishop by the anti-miaphysite metropolitan Domitian of Melitene before 602.

He and Paul of Tella lived as exiles in the Coptic monastery of the Enaton near Alexandria, Egypt. At the request of Athanasios I, they worked on a Syriac translation of the Greek Bible. Translation of the New Testament, known as the Harclensis was completed in 616. At this time, 2 Peter, 2 John, 3 John, Jude and Revelation were added to the Syriac Bible. Until then they were excluded.
