= Harklean version =

Syriac language bible translation by Thomas of Harqel completed in 616 AD in Egypt

The inter-relationship between various significant ancient manuscripts of the Old Testament (some identified by their siglum). LXX here denotes the original Septuagint.

The Harklean version, designated by syr^{h}, is a Syriac language bible translation by Thomas of Harqel completed in 616 AD at the Enaton in Egypt. The Harklean version has close affinities with the Byzantine text-type.

The version is partly based on the earlier Philoxenian version, partly a new and very literal translation from the Greek New Testament.
