= Sebastian Brock =

British scholar and university professor (born 1938)

Sebastian Brock FBA
- Born: 1938 (age 87–88); London, England
- Other name: Sebastian Paul Brock
- Occupation: Syriacist
- Spouse: Helen Hughes-Brock

Academic background
- Education: Eton College; Trinity College, Cambridge
- Alma mater: University of Oxford

Academic work
- Discipline: Syriac studies
- Institutions: University of Oxford
- Main interests: Classical Syriac

Sebastian Paul Brock (born 1938) is a British scholar, lecturer, and specialist in the field of academic studies of Classical Syriac language and Classical Syriac literature. His research also encompasses various aspects of cultural history of Syriac Christianity. He is generally acknowledged as one of the foremost academics in the field of Syriac studies, and one of the most prominent scholars in the wider field of Aramaic studies.

== Early life and education ==
Brock was born in London. He studied at Eton College and the completed his BA degree in classics and Oriental languages (Hebrew and Aramaic) at Trinity College, University of Cambridge. In 1966, he became Doctor of Philosophy at the University of Oxford.

== Career ==
Brock was Assistant Lecturer, and then Lecturer, at the University of Birmingham (Department of Theology) from 1964 to 1967. He continued his academic career as Lecturer in Hebrew, and then Lecturer in Hebrew and Aramaic, at the University of Cambridge, from 1967 to 1974. He was Lecturer in Aramaic and Syriac, and then Reader in Syriac Studies, at the University of Oxford's Oriental Institute, from 1974 to 2003. Since 2003, he has been Emeritus Reader in Syriac Studies and Emeritus Fellow of Wolfson College, Oxford.

Brock is one of the main reviewers of the Antioch Bible, a 21st-century English translation of the Peshitta.

== Affiliations and recognition ==
Brock is a Fellow of the British Academy. He is the recipient of a number of honorary doctorates, holding the PhD Honoris Causa at the École pratique des hautes études in Paris. Brock has been awarded the Medal of Saint Ephrem the Syrian by the Syriac Orthodox Patriarch of Antioch, and the Leverhulme Medal of the British Academy (2009). He was awarded the Edward Ullendorff Medal in 2024.

== Personal life ==
Brock is married to Helen Hughes-Brock, an archaeologist specialising in Minoan Crete and Mycenaean Greece. He is a patron of the Fellowship of Saint Alban and Saint Sergius. He joined the Syriac Orthodox Church by Chrismation in May 2024.

== Publications ==
- Brock, Sebastian P., ed. (1971). The Syriac Version of the Pseudo-Nonnos Mythological Scholia. London: Cambridge University Press.
- Brock, Sebastian P. (2008) [1979]. The Holy Spirit in the Syrian Baptismal Tradition (3rd ed.). Piscataway, NJ: Gorgias Press. ISBN 9781593338442.
- Brock, Sebastian P. (2017) [1980]. An Introduction to Syriac Studies (3rd revised ed.). Piscataway, NJ: Gorgias Press. ISBN 9781463207137.
- Brock, Sebastian P. (1984). Syriac Perspectives on Late Antiquity. London: Variorum Reprints. ISBN 9780860781479.
- Brock, Sebastian P. (1992) [1985]. The Luminous Eye: The Spiritual World Vision of Saint Ephrem (2nd revised ed.). Kalamazoo: Cistercian Publications. ISBN 9780879075248.
- Brock, Sebastian P. (1987). The Syriac Fathers on Prayer and the Spiritual Life. Kalamazoo: Cistercian Publications. ISBN 9780879076016.
- Brock, Sebastian P.; Harvey, Susan A. (1998) [1987]. Holy Women of the Syrian Orient. Berkeley: University of California Press. ISBN 9780520213661.
- Brock, Sebastian P. (2008) [1988]. Studies in Syriac Spirituality (2nd revised ed.). Bangalore: Center for Eastern and Indian Christian Studies. ISBN 9788189958176.
- Brock, Sebastian P. (1995). Catalogue of Syriac Fragments (New Finds) in the Library of the Monastery of Saint Catherine, Mount Sinai. Athens: Mount Sinai Foundation. ISBN 9789608573901.
- Brock, Sebastian P. (1996). Syriac Studies: A Classified Bibliography, 1960-1990. Kaslik: Parole de l'Orient.
- Brock, Sebastian P. (1997). A Brief Outline of Syriac Literature. Kottayam: St. Ephrem Ecumenical Research Institute.
- Brock, Sebastian P. (1999). From Ephrem to Romanos: Interactions Between Syriac and Greek in Late Antiquity. Aldershot: Ashgate. ISBN 9780860788003.
- Brock, Sebastian P. (2006). Fire from Heaven: Studies in Syriac Theology and Liturgy. Aldershot: Ashgate. ISBN 9780754659082.
- Bedjan, Paul; Brock, Sebastian P., eds. (2006). Homilies of Mar Jacob of Sarug. Piscataway, NJ: Gorgias Press. Vols. 1–6
- Brock, Sebastian P. (2019). The People and the Peoples: Syriac Dialogue Poems from Late Antiquity. Oxford: Journal of Jewish Studies. ISBN 9780957522817.
- Brock, Sebastian P. (2020). Singer of the Word of God: Ephrem the Syrian and his Significance in Late Antiquity. Piscataway, NJ: Gorgias Press. doi:10.31826/9781463239619. ISBN 9781463239619.

== Sources ==
- Abouzayd, Shafiq (1993). "Sebastian Paul Brock: Life and Work". ARAM Periodical. 5 (1–2): 1–22.
- Apostolache, Ioniţă (2017). "Dr. Sebastian Brock & his Romanian Academic Experience". The Harp. 32: 235–244.
- Drăgoi, Macarie (2010). "Professor Sebastian Brock and His Point of View on St. Ephrem the Syrian Theological Heritage". Altarul Reîntregirii. 1: 117–132.
- Kiraz, George A. (2004). "Sebastian Paul Brock: Haddaya of Syriac Studies" (PDF). Journal of Assyrian Academic Studies. 18 (1): 5–8. Archived from the original (PDF) on 20 November 2008.
