= Mandaean studies =

Academic discipline pertaining to Mandaeans and Mandaeism

Mandaean studies, or Mandaic studies when referring to linguistic studies, is the study of the Mandaean religion, Mandaean people, and Mandaic language. It can be considered as a subdiscipline of Aramaic studies, Semitic studies, Middle Eastern studies, and Oriental studies. Related disciplines include Syriac studies, Assyriology, Iranian studies, Jewish studies, and religious studies.

== History ==
=== Early history ===
One of the earliest Europeans to write detailed works about the Mandaeans was Ignatius of Jesus, an Italian Roman Catholic friar who published a 1652 treatise on Mandaeism, Narratio originis, rituum, & errorum christianorum Sancti Ioannis ("Narration of the Origin, the Rituals, and the Errors of the Christians of St. John").

During the 19th century, scholars such as Matthias Norberg and Julius Heinrich Petermann published printed versions of the Ginza Rabba. Petermann also performed field research with the Mandaeans in southern Iraq during the 1850s, where he worked with Yahya Bihram as his primary informant.

=== 20th century ===
In the early 20th century, Mandaean studies saw major progress as many works about Mandaeism were published, particularly translations of Mandaean texts into German by Mark Lidzbarski. During the 1930s, studies on Mandaeism were published by European scholars and writers such Hugo Odeberg (1930), Robert Stahl (1930), and Alfred Loisy (1934). Afterwards, the field went into a temporary hiatus due to the turmoils of World War II.

During the mid-1900s, Rudolf Macúch wrote a dictionary and grammar of Mandaic, while E. S. Drower (1879–1972) translated many hitherto unknown Mandaean texts into English and documented the Mandaean communities of Iraq in great detail. Drower spent decades in Iraq and obtained dozens of Mandaean texts for the Drower Collection through her primary field consultant, Sheikh Negm bar Zahroon. Even today, many Mandaean texts remain accessible to Western scholars solely through Drower's works.

During the latter half of the 20th century, other scholars active in Mandaean studies include Kurt Rudolph, Eric Segelberg, Edwin M. Yamauchi, and Edmondo Lupieri.

=== 21st century ===
During the 21st century, Mandaean studies underwent a revival as many new studies and textual translations were published. The most active 21st-century Mandaean studies scholars based in the United States are Jorunn Jacobsen Buckley, Charles G. Häberl, and James F. McGrath. Philologists outside the United States working on Mandaic texts include Bogdan Burtea in Germany, as well as Matthew Morgenstern and Ohad Abudraham in Israel. Scholars researching historical Mandaean art include Sandra van Rompaey in Australia.

After the 2003 U.S. invasion of Iraq, Mandaeans emigrated from Iraq en masse, with the Mandaean diaspora outnumbering those remaining in Iraq and Iran for the first time in history. With the majority of Mandaeans living permanently in Anglophone countries (especially Australia and the United States) and Western Europe, members of the Mandaean diaspora, including Brikha Nasoraia, Carlos Gelbert, Majid Fandi Al-Mubaraki, Yuhana Nashmi, Qais Al-Saadi, Dakhil Shooshtary, and many other Mandaeans were publishing books and documents about their religion, history, scriptures, and language in English, allowing international scholars unprecedented access to information about Mandaean religion and culture. In 2011, the first translation of the entire Ginza Rabba into English was published by Carlos Gelbert. During the mid-2010s, the World of Mandaean Priests project led by Christine Robins (née Allison) of the University of Exeter, with the assistance of Yuhana Nashmi, provided detailed multimedia documentation of Mandaean rituals, communities, and priests. In addition, archival work of Mandaic manuscripts is currently being undertaken by Rafid Al-Sabti and his son Ardwan Al-Sabti in Nijmegen, Netherlands.

Despite the significant progress made in Mandaean studies over the past several decades, Mandaean studies remains one of the least known subfields within Middle Eastern and Semitic studies. As stated by Charles G. Häberl (2022):

It would not be much of an exaggeration to claim that scholars of Late Antiquity in the Eastern Mediterranean and the Middle East have consigned Mandaeans to an oubliette for much of the past century, on the grounds that they are too cryptic, too late, too weird, and far too disassociated from the other peoples who have primarily served as the subjects for their own research. ... Mandaic is certainly not part of the standard repertoire of scholars working upon Late Antiquity, and not even of those working upon the Sasanian Empire, and while it is probably unreasonable to expect that it might someday join Greek, Latin, Hebrew, Arabic, and Persian among the other languages within that repertoire, I am nonetheless convinced that Mandaean texts ... will prove indispensable for elucidating some of the mysteries that attend the study of this period and region.

== Academic series ==
The following monographic series specialize in Mandaean studies:

- Gorgias Mandaean Studies by Gorgias Press
- Mandäistische Forschungen (German: "Mandaean Research") series by Harrassowitz Verlag

== Academic journals ==
Papers relating to Mandaean studies are regularly published in the ARAM Periodical.

== Conferences ==
The following ARAM International Conferences, organized by the ARAM Society for Syro-Mesopotamian Studies of the University of Oxford, were specifically dedicated to Mandaean studies. Mandaean priests also performed baptisms (masbutas) during the 1999, 2002, and 2007 conferences.

- ARAM 13th International Conference (13–15 June 1999), Harvard University (with masbutas performed in the Charles River)
- ARAM 17th International Conference (7 July 2002), The Oriental Institute, University of Oxford (with masbutas performed in the River Thames)
- ARAM 24th International Conference (8–10 July 2007), Sancta Sophia College, University of Sydney (with masbutas performed in the Nepean River at Penrith)
- ARAM 27th International Conference (9–11 July 2009), The Oriental Institute, University of Oxford
- ARAM 36th International Conference (8–9 July 2013), The Oriental Institute, University of Oxford

== See also ==
- Scholars of Mandaeism
- Outline of Mandaeism
