= Ishoʿ of Merv =

Ishoʿ of Merv (Syriac: Ishoʿ Maruzaya, Arabic: ʿĪsā al-Marwazī) was an East Syrian lexicographer of the 9th century AD. He was a native of Merv in the Abbasid Caliphate. He wrote a now lost glossary of Syriac words, which was used by Ishoʿ bar ʿAli in composing his own Syriac–Arabic glossary in the second half of the 9th century. According to the preface to Ishoʿ bar ʿAli's glossary, the work of Ishoʿ of Merv was poorly organized and differed at points from the glossary of Ḥunayn ibn Isḥāq. David Taylor sees Ishoʿ of Merv as augmenting the work of Ḥunayn, and Ishoʿ bar ʿAli in turn as augmenting him.

Rubens Duval identified Ishoʿ with the lexicographer Zekarya of Merv cited by Ḥasan bar Bahlul in the 10th century. Ḥasan, however, also cites Ishoʿ explicitly, so the proposed identification has not been widely accepted. The 14th-century catalogue of Syriac authors by ʿAbdishoʿ bar Brikha mentions only one lexicographer named Maruzaya (i.e., from Merv) and it is not clear if this is Ishoʿ or Zekarya or if they are one and the same.

The identification of Ishoʿ of Merv with the physician al-Marwazī who lived about 567 is highly unlikely. His identification with the physician and logician Abū Yaḥyā al-Marwazī, who lived in the 9th century is possible.

== Bibliography ==
- Butts, Aaron M. (2018) [2011]. "Ishoʿ of Merv". In Sebastian P. Brock; Aaron M. Butts; George A. Kiraz; Lucas Van Rompay (eds.). Gorgias Encyclopedic Dictionary of the Syriac Heritage: Electronic Edition. Gorgias Press [online ed. Beth Mardutho].
- Butts, Aaron M. (2019). "The Classical Syriac Language". In Daniel King (ed.). The Syriac World. Routledge. pp. 222–242.
- Taylor, David G. K. (2018) [2011]. "Syriac Lexicography". In Sebastian P. Brock; Aaron M. Butts; George A. Kiraz; Lucas Van Rompay (eds.). Gorgias Encyclopedic Dictionary of the Syriac Heritage: Electronic Edition. Gorgias Press [online ed. Beth Mardutho].
- Wright, William (1894). A Short History of Syriac Literature (PDF). Adam and Charles Black.
