= Rudolf Macúch =

Slovak Protestant theologian

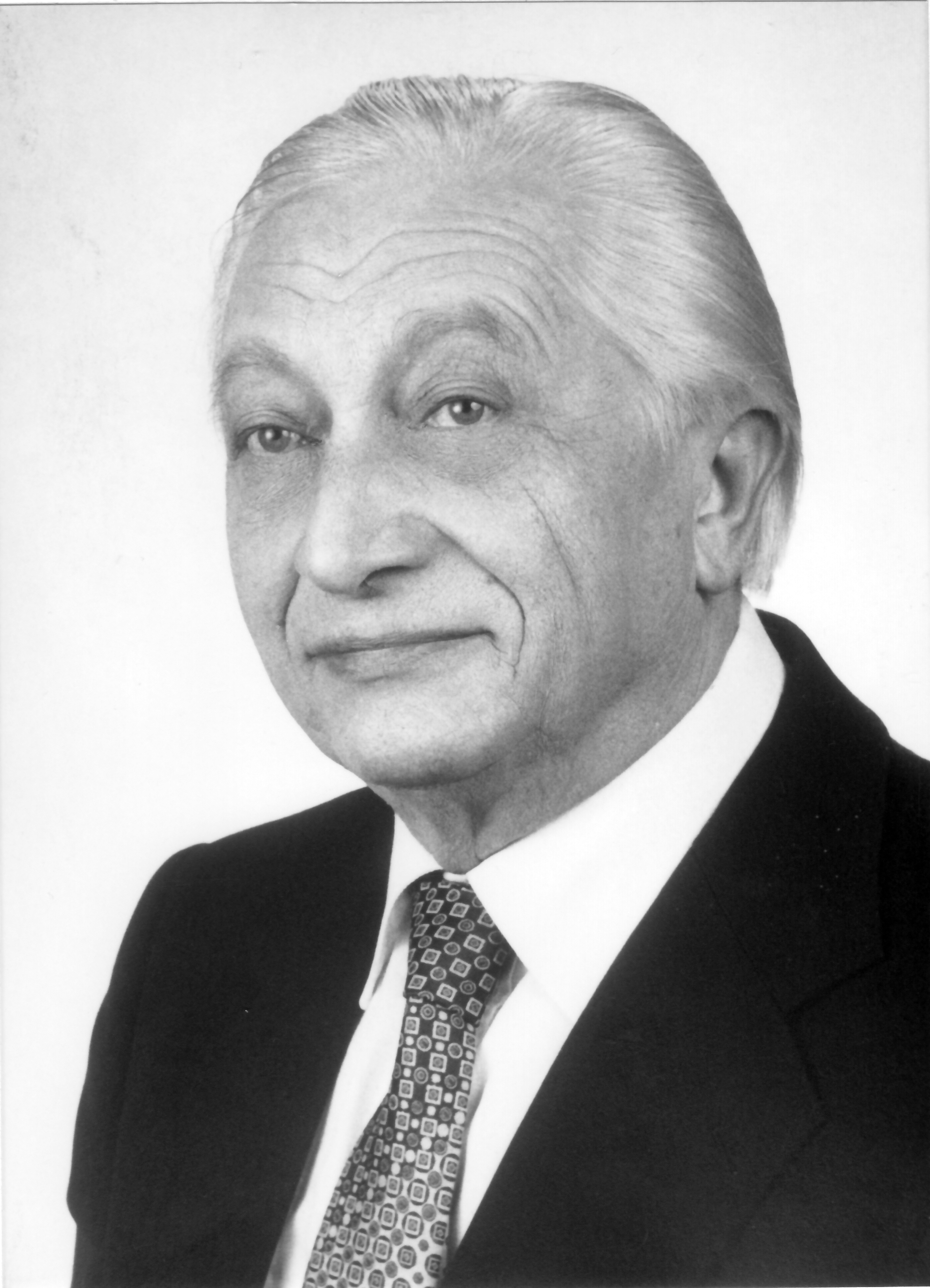
- Rudolf Macúch
- Born: 16 October 1919; Dolné Bzince, Czechoslovakia
- Died: 23 July 1993 (aged 73); Berlin, Germany
- Occupation: Professor

Academic work
- Main interests: Mandaic studies; Samaritan studies; New Syriac language and literature

Rudolf Macúch (16 October 1919 – 23 July 1993) was a Slovak linguist, naturalized as German after 1974.

He was noted in the field of Semitic studies for his research work in three main areas: (1) Mandaic studies, (2) Samaritan studies and (3) New Syriac language and literature. Although his scholarly work also covers the far larger range of Arabic and Iranian Studies as well as Theology and History of Religions, most of his monographs, and a large number of his numerous articles, are dedicated to the study of the languages and literatures of ethnic and religious minorities of the Near East, especially the Mandaeans, Samaritans and Nestorian Christians (or Assyrians, as they prefer to call themselves). His work is based mainly on extensive field work in various countries of the Middle East, where he personally collected the material used in his studies, thus in many cases preserving the cultural heritage of these minorities from being lost altogether.

== Biography ==
Rudolf Macúch was born on 16 October 1919, in the little village Dolné Bzince in Czechoslovakia (today Bzince pod Javorinou in western Slovakia) as the son of poor peasants. As a child, he visited from 1926 to 1931 the elementary school of his home village, later the Štefánika Gymnasium in Nové Mesto, a high-school that had been opened exactly in the year of his birth, 1919, bringing higher education to one of the remote places of Slovakia. In this excellent school, where he graduated in 1939, he discovered his love of languages, especially Latin and Greek, and the foundation was laid for his later work. Although he would have preferred to study Classical Philology, he chose Theology, since his parents were not able to finance his studies and this was the only possibility of receiving a grant from the Church. After registration in the Lutheran Theological Faculty of Bratislava, he visited courses on Bible text criticism by Ján Bakoš, a specialist of Semitic Studies, who had studied with famous Orientalists of his time, Julius Wellhausen, Enno Littman and Mark Lidzbarski, in Göttingen. Becoming aware of Macúch's special talent for languages Bakoš suggested that he study Semitic Languages and offered to teach him Arabic and Syriac personally.

During his study of Theology in Bratislava Rudolf Macúch also acted as cultural referent of the Theologian Society in the year 1940/41 and was responsible for the redaction of the journal Evanjelickí Teológ, in which he also published several of his own first articles. After finishing his second state examination in Theology in 1943, he was accepted as a student to the Franz-Rentorff-Haus, a theological school in Leipzig, where he planned to study Semitic Languages and Egyptology. He had, however, no means to finance his studies and his application to leave Czechoslovakia was refused by the military due to the war against Nazi Germany. After his ordination on the 26th of June 1943, he worked as a vicar from 1943-1945 and entered military service in 1944, hoping to continue his studies after the war. He resigned immediately his position as vicar when the war ended in 1945 after having received a grant from the French government enabling him to continue his study of Arabic and Semitic languages in Paris for two years (1945–47) at the Ecole nationale des langues orientales vivantes and the Ecole pratiques des hautes études. There he attended the courses of Professors Blachère and Sauvaget in the field of Arabic Studies and those of Professors Dhorme, Dupont-Sommer, Février, Virollaud, among other prolific scholars, in the field of Semitic Studies. Living in the Cité Universitaire he came into contact with students from different nationalities and met his later wife, Irandokht Shaghaghi, from Iran who studied Hygiene at the Faculty of Medicine.

In the meantime Rudolf Macúch's former teacher, Ján Bakoš, had left the Theological Faculty and became the first Ordinarius for Semitic Studies at the Philosophical Faculty of the Comenius University in Bratislava. This enabled Macúch to register as Bakoš's PhD student at the Philosophical Faculty, where he submitted his thesis on Slovanské mená a výrazy u arabských geografov ("Slavic Names and Expressions in Arabic Geographies"). He had already started to prepare this work in Paris, collecting the material directly from mostly unedited Arabic manuscripts at the Bibliothèque Nationale during the second year of his studies. He finished his doctorate on 30 June 1948, with the grade summa cum laude.

After receiving the position of assistant at the Institute of Semitic Studies in Bratislava in 1948–1949, Macúch married his fiancé on 31 March 1949. They decided to travel to Iran, where he could study Persian and Arabic manuscripts and come into contact with living Aramaic languages and dialects, in order to prepare his habilitation. Before departing he wrote his first monograph to be published, Islám a Kresťanstvo ("Islam and Christianity"), in order to finance the journey to Iran. Shortly after their arrival in Tehran their only child, a daughter named Maria Macúch, was born on 1 January 1950.

Although it had been planned otherwise, Macúch was not able to return to Bratislava because of political reasons. He refused to follow an order of the Czechoslovak embassy to return immediately because of the reign of terror established by the Communist Party in Czechoslovakia under Antonín Novotný after his departure. By refusing to obey, he lost his nationality and his work at the University of Bratislava and became a refugee in Iran. He began working as a teacher in an American missionary school, Community School, in Teheran, where he taught French, Latin and German. In 1954 he also received the position of dānešyār, "extraordinarius", at the University of Teheran for Semitic Languages. With his experience in learning languages, he learned Persian very quickly and was able to publish his first article in that language in the spring of 1950 with the title Nufūz-e Zardošt dar dīn-e Yahūd wa-Masīḥ ("Zarathustra's Impact on the Jewish and Christian Religions"). The most important achievement of these years, however, was his discovery of a hitherto unknown vernacular dialect spoken by the Mandaeans of Ahwāz (Khuzestan) during his field research in 1953, which he described in his Handbook of Classical and Modern Mandaic. Although this work was finished in 1955, it took 10 years to be brought out, since the publisher, Akademie-Verlag, in East Berlin, having accepted the manuscript, failed to print it. It was finally brought to West Berlin and published by Walter de Gruyter in 1965.

In 1955 Macúch published a review of Lady Ethel Stefana Drower's work The Haran Gawaita and the Baptism of Hibil-Ziwa in a renowned German scholarly journal. Although the review was extremely critical, it was exactly this kind of criticism that convinced Lady Drower that he was the best living specialist on Mandaic. She arranged for the Faculty of Oriental Studies in Oxford to invite him to work with her on A Mandaic Dictionary, which she had been planning for some time. After moving to Oxford with his small family, Macúch worked for two years, from 1957-1958, checking the material put into his disposition by Lady Drower, combining it with his own lexicographical collections, adding missing references, establishing meanings and etymologies. Although it was a feat of daring to engage in writing the dictionary within the timespan of two years under the conditions of that period (mechanical typewriter, no Internet, many relevant lexical works out-dated or still missing), he delivered the manuscript on time.

After spending several months in the United States and Canada in a futile search for a position at one of the Universities, Rudolf Macúch returned with his family to Iran, where his fortune finally turned. He started a lively correspondence on scholarly subjects with Franz Altheim, Professor of Ancient History of the Orient at the Free University of Berlin. Altheim had never met Macúch personally, but was nevertheless deeply impressed by his vast knowledge in the field of Semitic Studies and personally committed himself to bringing him to Berlin. After long years of waiting and desperation Rudolf Macúch finally received the call he had been longing for to the chair of Semitic and Arabic Studies at the Freie Universität Berlin in June 1963 at the age of 43.

The call to Berlin opened all the possibilities he had wished for over the years. He could finally dedicate himself entirely to his vocation without having to worry about financial problems, which had threatened him all his life, and could make use of all the privileges given to him as a full professor (Ordinarius). In Berlin he immediately began realizing different projects, working on the two other specialities he has since become famous for: Samaritan and New Syriac Studies. He undertook several long voyages to Nablus, where he came into contact with the Samaritans and collected Samaritan manuscripts, establishing the worldwide most extensive specialist library, including rare and valuable manuscripts, which has since been the goal of scholars of Samaritan from various parts of the world. He himself dedicated his work of the following five years to writing his Grammatik des samaritanischen Hebräisch ("Grammar of Samaritan Hebrew"), published in 1969. His next project in this field of study was the Grammatik des samaritanischen Aramäisch ("Grammar of Samaritan Aramaic"), published in 1982. These two grammars have become standard reference works for every student and scholar in the field.

During this time Macúch also established his third main field of research, New Syriac, which is represented by two monographs: the Neusyrische Chrestomathie ("New Syriac Chrestomathy", 1974 together with Estiphan Panoussi), and his monumental Geschichte der spät- und neusyrischen Literatur ("History of Late and New Syriac Literature"), published in 1976. This latter work was the result of decades of meticulously collecting literary works and journals written in Syriac, which were mostly unknown even to specialists of this field before this book was published. Although research in these two fields absorbed many years of his life, he never ceased to continue work in his first speciality, Mandaic Studies. Besides numerous articles, he published a monograph Zur Sprache und Literatur der Mandäer ("On the Language and Literature of the Mandeans") in 1976, dedicated to Lady Ethel Stefana Drower, and the Neumandäische Chrestomathie mit grammatischer Skizze, kommentierter Übersetzung und Glossar ("New Mandaic Chrestomathy with Grammatical Outline, Commented Translation and Glossary") in 1989. Towards the end of his life he worked with the Mandean Sheikh Čoheylī on New Mandaic texts, the results of which appeared in his monograph Neumandäische Texte im Dialekt von Ahwāz ("New Mandaic Texts in the Dialect of Ahwāz") two months after his death on 23 July 1993, at the age of 73.

Rudolf Macúch's work was by no means restricted to these three areas. He has dedicated numerous articles to many relevant fields of research in Arabic and Semitic Studies, being interested as a philologist not only in the languages of the said minorities, but also especially in the culture and identities of the people he was working with. He kept in touch with friends, informants and colleagues over many decades, corresponding with them in letters filling several thick volumes in different languages and scripts, English, French, German, Slovak, Czech, Russian, Persian, Arabic, Hebrew, Mandaic and Syriac. He saw language as the most important prerequisite to communicating with people of other cultures and tying bonds across ethnical and religious barriers. Scholars of the field appreciate his work worldwide and he is esteemed in his homeland, Slovakia, as one of the renowned humanist scholars of Europe (even a small planet in the Asteroid girdle, discovered by Peter Kolény and Leonard Kornoš in 1998, has been named after him: 24974 Macúch). He received numerous honours for his life achievement, one of which was his designation as a member of the Norwegian Academy of Sciences on 10 March 1988 – an honour bestowed on only a few distinguished scholars.

== Scholarly work ==
Rudolf Macúch's scholarly work encompasses contributions to a large range of disciplines: (1) Theology and History of Religions; (2) Arabic and Iranian Studies; (3) Semitic Studies, with his most important research in three specialities, (a) Mandaic, (b) Samaritan and (c) New Syriac. Since he employed an interdisciplinary approach in his work, these various fields are so intertwined that it is hardly possible to describe his contributions to them separately without risking repetitions – an attempt which is nevertheless undertaken in the following overview for the sake of clarity.

=== Theology and religious history ===
Due to his first field of study Rudolf Macúch's first publications were dedicated to religious and theological topics, many of which appeared in the Slovak journal Evanjelickí Teológ. Among these contributions three articles documenting his early interest in Old Testament studies and comparative religious history may be mentioned here: "Marcion's Views of the Old Testament" ("Marcionove názory na Starý zákon"), on the first century Christian heretic Marcion and his condemnation of the Old Testament; "Obadiah's Prophecy" ("Proroctovo Abdiášovo"), a discussion of the "Book of Obadiah", attributed to the Jewish prophet Obadiah (ca. 5th century B.C.); and "The Creation of the World in the Biblical and Babylonian Tradition" ("Stvorenie sveta v podaní biblickom a babylonskom”). His first published monograph Islám a Kresťanstvo ("Islam and Christianity") is mainly an introduction to Islamic history and culture with a chapter on parallel developments in Christianity, which was so well received in the year of its publication that it was reprinted the following year (then repressed during the long Communist regime of Antonín Novotný in Czechoslovakia). He returned to the topic of Christianity and Islam towards the end of his life, planning an extensive monograph titled Kritik der monotheistischen Religionen ("Critique of the Monotheistic Religions"), which remained fragmentary due to his demise and was not published. His continuing interest in religious questions is, however, documented in other publications, in which he repeatedly discussed the texts he was studying also from this perspective, using his philological findings for a better understanding of their historical and cultural context, among others "Gnostische Ethik und die Anfänge der Mandäer" ("Gnostic Ethics and the Beginnings of the Mandeans"); "The Importance of Samaritan Traditions for the Hermeneutics of the Pentateuch"; "The μεταγράφαι of Jesus' Words in the Gospels and the Traditional Pronunciation of Samaritan Aramaic". Other contributions relevant to this area, especially in connection with the Mandean religion, can be found in his main fields of research described below.

=== Arabic studies and subjects relevant to Iranian studies ===
Macúch's dissertation Slovanské mená a výrazy u arabských geografov (“Slavic Names and Expressions in Arabic Geographies”) is an attempt to read and explain a large range of enigmatic Slavic names and terms in Arabic geographies, the material for which he had collected from manuscripts at the Bibliothèque Nationale in Paris (see Vita above). The topic is of utmost interest for Slavic studies, since the oldest of these Arabic geographies were written before the emergence of Slavic literatures. Expressions transmitted in them could therefore contribute to our knowledge of the oldest and even pre-literary levels of the Slavic languages, but the Arabic authors hardly ever noted the terms correctly, leading to numerous problems of reading and interpretation. Although his mentor Bakoš and other teachers pressed him to publish this work immediately, he himself was not satisfied with the results and wanted to include different readings from manuscripts which he had not yet consulted. He never published his thesis due to circumstances beyond his command. His focus of interest shifted to other areas, but he returned occasionally to topics in the field of Arabic studies in several important articles, among these „Zur Vorgeschichte der Bekenntnisformel lā ilāha illā llāhu“ (“On the Prehistory of the Creedal Statement lā ilāha illā llāhu“); “On the Problems of the Arabic Translation of the Samaritan Pentateuch”; and a lecture on the “Discrepancy between the Grammarians” (“Iḫtilāf an-naḥwiyyūn”) held in Arabic at the University of al-Miniā, Egypt, in 1981. He was actively involved in establishing an international, interdisciplinary research group on Graeco-Arabic topics, thus combining his first interest, Classics, with his later vocation. He wrote reports on the conferences of the Research Group in order to introduce their achievements to the scholarly community, became the honorary President of the Graeco-Arabic Society in Delphi and helped establish a journal dedicated to this field, Graeco-Arabica. His own contributions include articles on “Greek Technical Terms in Arabic Sciences”; “Greek and Oriental Sources of Avicenna’s and Sohrawardi’s Theosophies“; “Pseudo-Callisthenes Orientalis and the Problem of Ḏū l-qarnain”.

He also published several articles, most of them in Persian, on subjects relevant to Iranian Studies. His first contribution shortly after his arrival in Iran, “Nufūḏ-e Zardošt dar dīn-e Yahūd wa-Masīḥ“ („Zarathustra’s Impact on the Jewish and Christian Religions”) has already been mentioned above. Another long article in three parts is dedicated to specific problems of the Aramaic language (“Imperial Aramaic” or “Reichsaramäisch”) in the Achaemenid period, “Zabān-e ārāmī dar dowre-ye haḫāmanišī. Qesmat-e awwal” (“The Aramaic Language in the Achaemenid Period. Part One.”). Contributions of later years include „Ahammiyyat-e sāmī-šenāsī barāye īrān šenāsī“ (“The Importance of Semitic Studies for Iranian Studies“) and „Zur altiranischen Onomastik in aramäischer Nebenüberlieferung“ („On Old Iranian Onomastics in Aramaic Secondary Sources“).

=== Semitic studies ===
==== Mandaic and Mandaeans ====
Macúch made major contributions to this field, one of his three main specialities, to which he dedicated many years of his life. Seeking to study the East Aramaic language of the Mandaeans, a small gnostic sect living in the Iranian Khuzestan province, bordering on the Persian Gulf, in Ahwāz near the Karun river, he contacted them in 1953. Although it was known that Mandaeans lived in Khuzestan, no one had hitherto tried to consult them in order to check the linguistic and contextual controversies involved in the study of classical Mandaic texts. Macúch undertook the journey in order to study the traditional pronunciation of classical Mandaic, but he discovered to his own surprise that the language was still spoken there as a vernacular dialect, hitherto unknown to Semitists. He was able to make phonetic recordings of the spoken modern dialect, in which classical forms and vocabulary still partly continued. In 1953, his gathered field notes from Nāṣer Ṣābūrī, the “ritual slaughterer” of the community, and to become acquainted with the traditional pronunciation of the Mandaean priests; in 1989, he would later perform further field work with Salem Choheili, a yalufa (learned Mandaean layman) of Ahvaz. Although the modern idiom, being overlaid by foreign influences, especially from Persian and Arabic, differs from the language of the classical Mandaic texts, it was, as Macúch found out, important for understanding the linguistic phenomena of the classical tongue. It served as a guide to the study of the phonetic structure of classical Mandaic and to the traditional pronunciation of the literary and liturgical language. After having received 30 microfilms containing the essential Mandaic literature and related fields from Prof. Roemer (University of Mainz) he began to analyse the material he had gathered during his field research and to undertake a meticulous comparison of the colloquial and traditional languages. The result of this work was published in his monograph Handbook of Classical and Modern Mandaic, in which he undertakes a parallel description of both idioms. Although this work was already finished by 1955, it took ten years to be published due to circumstances already mentioned above (see Vita). It was not Macúch's goal to replace Theodor Nöldeke’s classical Mandaic Grammar of 1875, but to complement it, especially in his treatment of Mandaic phonetics on the basis of the modern vernacular, leading to several corrections of the latter’s conclusions. The Handbook is an extensive treatment of the topic, in which the phonetics, morphology and essentials of syntax in both the classic (in bold letters) and modern idioms (in italics) are explained with a large number of examples for every phenomenon. The analysis of the new material also made it possible to divide Mandaic into three periods: classical (ending with the redaction of the Ginza, ca. 7th century), post-classical and the modern language, a division which delivers an important key for the critical analysis of Mandaic literature, although a precise limitation of the duration of these periods is not possible. The Handbook led to a large number of reviews over the years, thirteen of which are discussed extensively by Macúch in a later book dedicated to the memory of Lady Drower, Zur Sprache und Literatur der Mandäer.

Mandaeans also resided in Southern Iraq, where their religion and texts were studied by one of the most prolific authors in this field, Lady Ethel Stefana Drower, who was, however, a self-made scholar and felt the need to collaborate with an academic expert in her next enterprise. In 1955, Macúch wrote a critical review of one of Lady Drower’s publications (see Vita above) which led to his invitation to Oxford in order to work with her in preparing A Mandaic Dictionary. Lady Drower had collected a large number of hitherto unknown manuscripts during her stay in Iraq (the “Drower Collection” of the Bodleian Library Oxford), hereby laying the foundation for this large work, which was completed by the material recorded by Macúch in Khuzestan and the card index by Mark Lidzbarski for the classical religious texts. The dictionary is therefore based not only on literary sources, but also includes the vocabulary of the vernacular described by Macúch in his Handbook and comparative material from other Semitic languages.

He also published vast textual material, including both ancient sources and texts in the modern vernacular, demonstrating that already in early times there was a gnostic literary language attributed to the priests, the Naṣuraiia (Nasoraeans) meaning observers, besides the spoken language of the laity, the Mandaiia (Mandaeans). A form closer to the vernacular than the language of the sacred books is preserved in ancient magic texts and formulae from a different sphere of religious beliefs. He dedicated a long article in two parts (1967 and 1968) to the decipherment and editing of lead rolls inscribed with Mandaic charms, „Altmandäische Bleirollen“ (“Old Mandaic Lead Rolls”). The first part discusses the largest lead roll, incised in the smallest scribal hand known so far, containing a row of various charms with noteworthy spelling variants that do not correspond with the standard classic Mandaic orthography. That he was able to read most of it and tried to get some sense out of it can be considered a major achievement, since only two very easily legible Mandaic lead rolls had been published so far. The edition of several shorter lead scrolls followed in the second part.

His work on New Mandaic texts include several contributions over the years, beginning with an article in the Festschrift of his mentor, Ján Bakoš (“The Bridge of Shushtar. A Legend in Vernacular Mandaic with Introduction, Translation and Notes”). In later years, two monographs are dedicated to analysing and preserving New Mandaic texts: Neumandäische Chrestomathie mit grammatischer Skizze, kommentierter Übersetzung und Glossar (“New Mandaic Chrestomathy with Grammatical Sketch, Annotated Translation and Glossary”) and Neumandäische Texte im Dialekt von Ahwāz (“New Mandaic Texts in the Dialect of Ahwāz”). Both books include extensive chapters on the grammar besides a phonetic transcription of the texts, translation and glossary. The latter publication was prepared with the help of Sheikh Sālem Čoheylī, a priestly candidate from Ahwāz, who had written to Macúch asking him for help in perfecting his knowledge of classical Mandaic, since he had opened a unique Mandaic school for children and adults in Ahwāz. Using his sojourn in Berlin in 1990, which was financed by the Deutsche Forschungsgemeinschaft (DFG), to record texts, Macúch discovered that strange differences exist in the phonetics and morphology of the Čoheylī tribe in comparison to his earlier source of the fifties, the Ṣābūrī tribe. His last monograph discusses these divergent grammatical features based on chosen oral texts recorded in his sessions with the Sheikh.

His numerous articles in this field are dedicated to several controversially discussed problems, especially regarding the origins of the Mandeans and their religion, in „Alter und Heimat des Mandäismus nach neuerschlossenen Quellen“ (“Age and Homeland of the Mandeans According to New Sources”), „Anfänge der Mandäer“ (“The Beginnings of the Mandeans”); „Zur Frühgeschichte der Mandäer“ (“On the Early History of the Mandeans”); “The Origins of the Mandaeans and their Script”; „Gnostische Ethik und die Anfänge der Mandäer“ (“Gnostic Ethics and the Beginnings of the Mandeans”). Other contributions include a concise introduction to “Mandaic”; an overview on the state of the art („Der gegenwärtige Stand der Mandäerforschung und ihre Aufgaben“); on the situation of the Mandean community in Iran after the Islamic revolution in 1979 („Ein neumandäischer Brief aus dem Frühjahr 1990 und die Lage der iranischen Mandäer nach der islamischen Revolution“) and comparative studies, „Der keilschriftliche Beschwörungstext aus Uruk und die mandäische Phraseologie“ (“The Cuneiform Incantation Text from Uruk and Mandaic Phraseology”).

==== Samaritan studies ====
After his call to the chair of Semitic and Arabic Studies in Berlin in 1963 Macúch dedicated many years to studying the linguistic and literary traditions of another dwindling ethnic minority, the Samaritans of Palestine, who cultivate their own religious customs and have their own liturgy and rites. The Samaritans, well known in the Christian tradition as deviants from mainstream Judaism from the parable of the “good Samaritan” in the New Testament, accept only their own version of the Pentateuch, the first five books of the Hebrew Bible, which differs from the Masoretic text, the authoritative Hebrew text for Rabbinic Judaism. Macúch contacted the Samaritans in Nablus, where their Holy Place on Mount Gerizim is situated, and spent many months recording the pronunciation of Samaritan Hebrew with the high priest and other priests. He was able to establish the worldwide most extensive specialist library of Samaritan Studies, including valuable original manuscripts, microfilms of dispersed manuscripts from various libraries and institutions worldwide as well as all the monographs and scholarly articles to date at the Institute in Berlin. This collection of material was so unique that it attracted scholars from different regions of the world, even from Jerusalem, the centre of Samaritan Studies, to work in Berlin. Besides organizing the library Macúch worked five years on his Grammatik des samaritanischen Hebräisch (“Grammar of Samaritan Hebrew”), which is a through treatment of the differences between Samaritan and Jewish-Masorean Hebrew in orthography, phonology, morphology and syntax. As to the pronunciation of Samaritan Hebrew, which is interesting from the point of view of linguistic history, he did not rely on his predecessors Z. Ben-Ḥayyim and A. Murtonen, but used his own recordings of texts from his sessions with the Samaritan priests in Nablus. The language is problematic, since the Samaritans were far more flexible in their handling of the sacred text than the Jews, with the result that Samaritan-Hebrew manuscripts show not only numerous variants to the Jewish-Masoretic text, but also among themselves. The Grammar is an especially important contribution to the linguistic history of Hebrew. Macúch's other extensive monograph in this field, his Grammatik des samaritanischen Aramäisch (“Grammar of Samaritan Aramaic”), was an even more difficult task to achieve due to the complicated state of the sources. Hebrew manuscripts of the Bible were translated between the 3rd century BC and the 9th century AD into the colloquial language of Palestine, Aramaic, then enlarged and commented on. No grammatical study of the language of these texts had been hitherto undertaken, since there was still no reliable edition of the Aramaic translation (Targum) of the Samaritan texts before 1980. The material for this grammar had to be extracted from the original unedited manuscripts. After the critical edition of the first part of the Samaritan Targum (books Genesis and Exodus) by A. Tal appeared in 1980, Macúch was able to add this material to his own extensive collection from Samaritan Aramaic literature and complete the Grammar, another meticulous contribution to linguistic history, giving access to difficult texts important for the study of other Aramaic dialects.

Specific linguistic problems of this field were also analysed in several articles on „Der liquide Apikal und die apikale Liquide des samaritanischen Hebräisch" (“The Liquid Apical and the Apical Liquids of Samaritan Hebrew“); „Zur Grammatik des samaritanischen Hebräisch“ (“On the Grammar of Samaritan Hebrew“); „Einige Probleme der Grammatik des samaritanischen Aramäisch“ (“Several Problems of the Grammar of Samaritan Aramaic“);“A New Interpretation of the Samaritan Inscription from Tell Qasile”; “Les bases philologiques de l’ herméneutique et les bases herméneutiques de la philologie chez les Samaritains“; “Pseudo-Ethiopisms in Samaritan Hebrew and Aramaic”. He gives a broad introduction in “Samaritan Languages: Samaritan Hebrew, Samaritan Aramaic”, and an overview of the state of the art in „Der gegenwärtige Stand der Samaritanerforschung und ihre Aufgaben“.

==== New Syriac language and literature ====
Macúch's third major speciality is dedicated to the study of the language and literature of the Nestorian Christians residing in Iran and Iraq, who call themselves “Assyrians”. His monograph Neusyrische Chrestomathie (“New Syriac Chrestomathy”), conceived together with Estiphan Panoussi, is the first collection of excerpts and examples from a large range of different literary texts written in New Syriac from various periods, beginning in 1848 up to the 1970s. Most of the texts are written in the dialect of Urmia, others in the dialects of Iraq, Alqoš and Sanandaǧ. Besides a short grammatical sketch, the book contains a detailed glossary, in which all the idioms are taken into consideration. His next major achievement in this field, the monumental Geschichte der spät- und neusyrischen Literatur (“History of Late and New Syriac Literature”), is the first work on Syriac literature after the Mongol invasion in the 13th century. He had already begun to collect the material for this difficult undertaking years ago in Iran, bringing together the texts from a large range of different literary sources, books, articles and numerous journals, among these several rare publications, difficult to find at that period and by now completely inaccessible. Besides this material he used three histories of Syriac literature written in Arabic and Syriac. Due to the vast material presented in the book, including an overview of the historical setting of every discussed period, extensive summaries of the literary works and numerous details on the authors, this work has been greeted as one of the most important scholarly achievements of the past decades in this field. The book fulfils two important desiderata: (1) it offers an introduction to the hardly known Late Syriac literature since the Mongolian invasion in the 13th century, and (2) it presents a unique overview of the huge range of literary works produced in New Syriac, many of which were still completely unknown even to specialists of this field before its publication.

Two other contributions give summaries of the history and literary history of the Assyrians, “Assyrians in Iran I.: The Assyrian community (Āšūrīān) in Iran. II: Literature of the Assyrians in Iran”, and “Tūr ʿAbdīn through the Ages”.

==== Other Aramaic studies ====
As a scholar with an exceptionally broad range of knowledge in Semitic languages, Macúch also published articles on other topics besides these three major fields, especially in the area of comparative Aramaic studies: „Gesprochenes Aramäisch und aramäische Schriftsprachen“ (“Spoken Aramaic and Aramaic Written Languages”), “A ‘Revised Reading’ of an Aramaic Papyrus”; „Hermeneutische Akrobatik aufgrund phonetischen Lautwandels in aramäischen Dialekten“ (“Hermeneutic Acrobatics due to Phonetic Change in Aramaic Dialects”); “Recent Studies in Palestinian Aramaic”; “Recent studies in Neo-Aramaic dialects”; “Some Orthographico-phonetic Problems of Ancient Aramaic and the Living Aramaic Pronunciations”; “Some lexicographical problems of Jewish Palestinian Aramaic”.

== Significance of Macúch's work today ==
Macúch's major publications, his Mandaic Handbook and Mandaic Dictionary, his two Grammars in the field of Samaritan Studies and his History of Late and New Syriac literature are standard works of Semitic Studies, still used as tools for many working in these disciplines today. Despite new findings and scholarly progress in many details over the decades, these works based on an analysis of original sources and field research have not yet been replaced by similarly extensive studies. This may be due to the fact that every new attempt to analyse this vast material would be judged in the scholarly community by the high standards set by Macúch's work. The textual sources presented in his other monographs are major contributions, since they preserve rare material, which would otherwise have sunk into oblivion. His field research in these areas has contributed to the preservation of age-old cultural traditions, many of which would have been lost irretrievably in the course of the political turmoil of the past decades in Iran and the Near East.

== Major publications ==
For a full list of his publications see Ján Juráš and Daniela Kodajová (ed.), Sláva šl’achetným III. (“Glory to the Noble”) Liptovský Mikuláš: Spolok Martina Rázusa 2014, pp. 83-88. The bibliography in his Festschrift includes his work up to 1989 (see Maria Macuch, Christa Müller-Kessler, Bert G. Fragner [eds.], Studia Semitica necnon Iranica Rudolpho Macuch septuagenario ab amicis et discipulis dedicata, Wiesbaden: Otto Harrassowitz 1989, pp. XXV-XXXII).

=== Monographs ===
- Islám a kresťanstvo. Historické a kultúrno-naboženské štúdie o isláme (“Islam and Christianity. Religious and Cultural Studies on Islam“). Nábožensko-náučna knižnica („Library of Religious Sciences“). Liptovský Mikuláš: Tranoscius 1950.
- A Mandaic Dictionary (with E. S. Drower). Oxford: Clarendon Press 1963.
- Handbook of Classical and Modern Mandaic. Berlin: Walter de Gruyter 1965.
- Grammatik des Samaritanischen Hebräisch (“Grammar of Samaritan Hebrew”), Berlin: Walter de Gruyter 1969. (Studia Samaritana, Bd. 1).
- Neusyrische Chrestomathie (with E. Panoussi) (“New Syriac Chrestomathy”) Wiesbaden: Otto Harrassowitz 1974 (Porta Linguarum Orientalium, N.S. XID).
- Zur Sprache und Literatur der Mandäer. With Kurt Rudolph and Eric Segelberg (“On the Language and Literature of the Mandeans”), Berlin: Walter de Gruyter 1976 (Studia Mandaica I).
- Geschichte der spät- und neusyrischen Literatur (“History of Late and New Syriac Literature”). Berlin: Walter de Gruyter 1976.
- Grammatik des Samaritanischen Aramäisch (“Grammar of Samaritan Aramaic”). Berlin: Walter de Gruyter 1982. (Studia Samaritana IV).
- Neumandäische Chrestomathie mit grammatischer Skizze, kommentierter Übersetzung und Glossar. Unter Mitwirkung von Klaus Boekels (“New Mandaic Chrestomathy with Grammatical Sketch, Annotated Translation and Glossary”). Wiesbaden: Otto Harassowitz 1989 (Porta linguarum orientalium. Neue Serie, Bd. XVITI).
- Neumandäische Texte im Dialekt von Ahwāz. With Guido Dankwarth. (“New Mandaic Texts in the Dialect of Ahwāz”) Wiesbaden: Otto Harrassowitz 1993 (Semitica Viva, Band 12).
