= Isho bar Ali =

First page of Borg. Arab. 250

Ishoʿ bar ʿAli (fl. late 9th century AD), known in Arabic as ʿĪsā (or Yashūʿ) ibn ʿAlī, was a Syriac author and physician. A student of Ḥunayn ibn Isḥāq and a member of the Church of the East, he served as the personal physician to the Caliph al-Muʿtamid (r. 870–892).

Bar ʿAli's known writings include two medical treatises in Arabic, one on poisons and one on the "use of the organs of animals". His most famous work is his Syriac–Arabic lexicon, an attempt to improve on the work of Ḥunayn ibn Isḥāq and Ishoʿ of Merv. In addition to authoring his own works, he worked as a scribe copying those of others. The colophons of two manuscripts of the Arabic Diatessaron name him as the copyist: Borg. Arab. 250 in the Vatican Library and Arab. e 163 in the Bodleian Library.

== Works cited ==
- Butts, Aaron M. (2009). "The Biography of the Lexicographer Ishoʿ bar ʿAli (ʿĪsā b. ʿAlī)". Oriens Christianus. 93: 59–70.
- Butts, Aaron M. (2011). "Bar ʿAli, Ishoʿ". In Sebastian P. Brock; Aaron M. Butts; George A. Kiraz; Lucas Van Rompay (eds.). Gorgias Encyclopedic Dictionary of the Syriac Heritage. Gorgias Press. Online edition published by Beth Mardutho in 2018.
- Gottheil, Richard J. H., ed. (2009) [1910–1928]. Bar ʿAli (Ishoʿ): The Syriac–Arabic Glosses. Vol. 1 and Vol. 2. Gorgias Press.
- Kessel, Grigory (2017). "A Syriac Medical Kunnāšā of Īšōʿ bar ʿAlī (9th c.): First Soundings". Intellectual History of the Islamicate World. 5 (3): 228–251. doi:10.1163/2212943X-00503015. PMC 6420110.
