= Dakhil Shooshtary =

Iranian-American Mandaean writer (1934–2022)

- Born: c. 1934; Khorramshahr, Iran
- Died: January 26, 2022; New York, United States
- Occupations: Writer, lexicographer
- Known for: Mandaean calendars
- Notable work: English-Mandaic dictionary (2012); Arabic-Mandaic dictionary (2012); Farsi-Mandaic dictionary (2012)
- Spouse: Noona

Dakhil A. Shooshtary (Persian: دخيل شوشتری; born c. 1934, Khorramshahr; died January 26, 2022, New York) was an Iranian-American Mandaean writer, lexicographer, and calendar maker. As one of the last remaining fully fluent native speakers of Neo-Mandaic, he is known for his Mandaic dictionaries.

== Biography ==
Dakhil Shooshtary was born in Khuzestan, Iran during the 1930s. His last name was derived from Shushtar, the name of a city in Khuzestan, Iran. Dakhil Shooshtary was born about 10 years after his brother Nasser Sobbi, who was born on March 13, 1924. He later emigrated to the state of New York in the United States.

Shooshtary was a fluent native speaker, reader, and writer of Mandaic. He spoke Neo-Mandaic regularly with his brother Nasser Sobbi and his uncle Abdolkarim Moradi, a resident of Syosset, New York.

In addition to his work on Mandaic dictionaries, Shooshtary was known for making Mandaean calendars.

He died on January 26, 2022, in New York state.

== Family ==
Dakhil Shooshtary was married to Noona.

== Books ==
- Shooshtary, Dakhil (2012). English-Mandaic Dictionary. Bloomington, Indiana. ISBN 978-1-4567-6361-9. (or ISBN 978-1-4567-6363-3)
- Shooshtary, Dakhil (2012). Arabic-Mandaic Dictionary (in Arabic). Bloomington, Indiana. ISBN 978-1-4567-6357-2.
- Shooshtary, Dakhil (2012). Farsi-Mandaic Dictionary (in Persian). Bloomington, Indiana. ISBN 978-1-4567-6360-2.

== See also ==
- Nasser Sobbi
- Sinan Abdullah
- Salem Choheili
- Rudolf Macúch
