= Charles G. Häberl =

American linguist

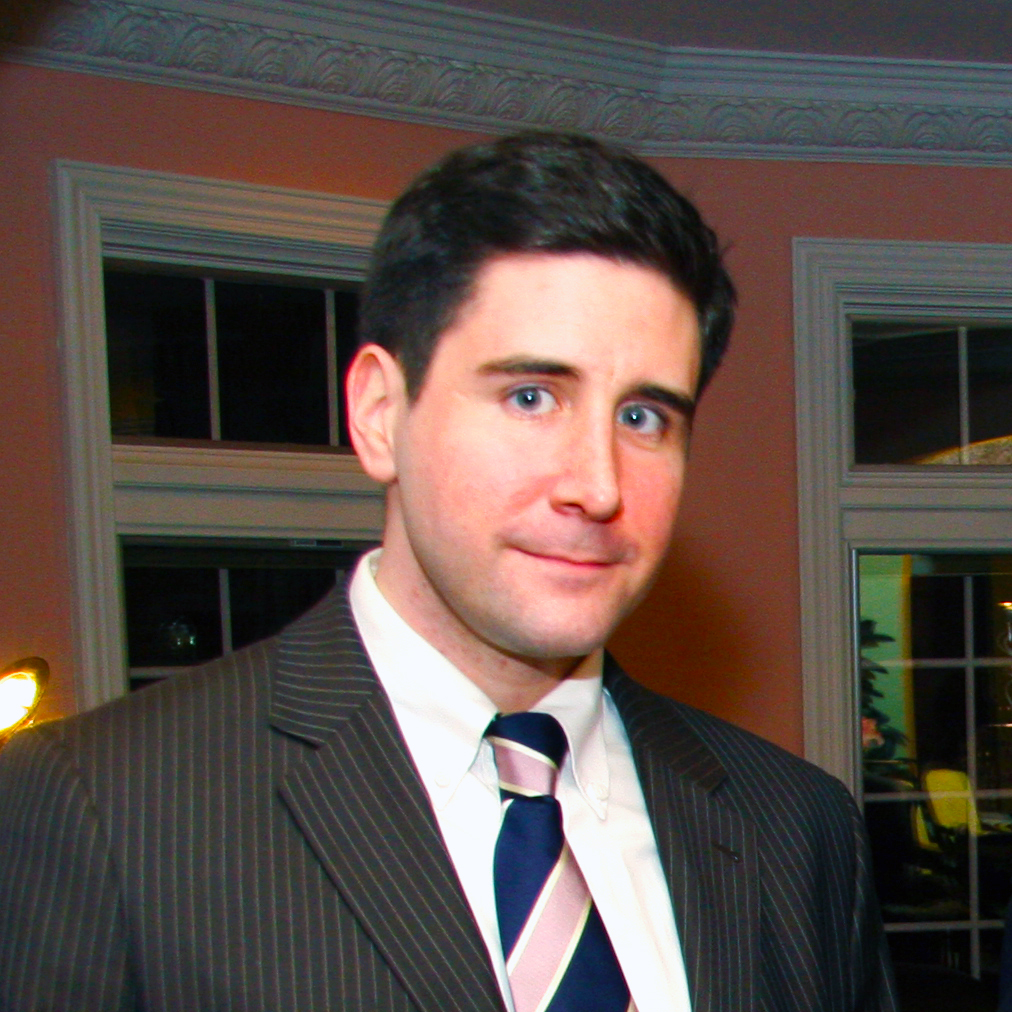
- Born: June 22, 1976 (age 50); New Jersey, United States

Academic background
- Education: Harvard University; Brown University
- Thesis: The Neo-Mandaic Dialect of Khorramshahr (2006)

Academic work
- Institutions: Rutgers University
- Main interests: Mandaeism; Mandaic studies; Semitic studies; Linguistics; Semitic philology

Charles G. Häberl (born June 22, 1976 in New Jersey, United States) is an American linguist, religious studies scholar, and professor. He is currently Professor of African, Middle Eastern, and South Asian Languages and Literatures (AMESALL) and Religion at Rutgers University. Häberl's primary interests include Mandaeism, Semitic philology, and Middle Eastern studies. He is known for his translation of the Mandaean Book of John in collaboration with James F. McGrath, as well as for his research on the Neo-Mandaic dialect of Khorramshahr, Iran.

== Biography ==
Häberl was born and raised in New Jersey, United States. He holds a PhD degree in Semitic philology from the Department of Near Eastern Languages and Civilizations at Harvard University. As part of his doctoral research, Häberl documented the Neo-Mandaic dialect of Khorramshahr, Iran, collaborating with Nasser Sobbi as his primary language consultant. Häberl is currently a professor at Rutgers University.

From 2009 to 2012, he was the Director of the Center for Middle Eastern Studies at Rutgers University and in 2013–2019, chair of the department. He was also the Near East Regional Director for the Catalogue of Endangered Languages. In 2007, the first ever awarded U.S. Department of Education Title VIA Undergraduate International Studies and Foreign Language (UISFL) program grant to support instruction on Iranian studies was authored by him. He became an Anna-Maria Kellen Fellow at the American Academy in Berlin in 2016. In 2021, he was elected president of the International Linguistic Association, which publishes Word, and currently serves on the board of the Endangered Language Alliance of NYC.

== Selected publications ==
=== Monographs ===
The following is a selection of monographs authored by Häberl.

- 2009. The Neo-Mandaic Dialect of Khorramshahr. Wiesbaden: Harrassowitz. (published revision of Häberl's 2006 doctoral dissertation)
- 2020. The Mandaean Book of John: critical edition, translation, and commentary. Berlin: De Gruyter. (with James F. McGrath)
- 2022. The Book of Kings and the Explanations of This World: A Universal History from the Late Sasanian Empire. Liverpool: Liverpool University Press.

=== Articles and chapters ===
The following is a selection of Häberl's journal articles and book chapters.

Articles authored

- Häberl, Charles G. (February 2006). "Iranian Scripts for Aramaic Languages: The Origin of the Mandaic Script". Bulletin of the American Schools of Oriental Research (341): 53–62. doi:10.7282/T37D2SGZ.
- Häberl, Charles G. (2007). Introduction to the New Edition, in The Great Treasure of the Mandaeans, a new edition of J. Heinrich Petermann’s Thesaurus s. Liber Magni, with a new introduction and a translation of the original preface by Charles G. Häberl. Gorgias Press, LLC. doi:10.7282/T3C53J6P
- Häberl, Charles G. (2009). "The Production and Reception of a Mandaic Incantation". Afroasiatic Studies in Memory of Robert Hetzron: Proceedings of the 35th Annual Meeting of the North American Conference on Afroasiatic Linguistics. Cambridge Scholars.
- Häberl, Charles G. (Spring 2017). "The Origin and Meaning of Mandaic". Journal of Semitic Studies. 62 (1). Oxford University Press: 77–91. doi:10.1093/jss/fgw044.
- Häberl, Charles G. (2021). "Of Calendars—and Kings—and Why the Winter is Boiling Hot". Journal of the Royal Asiatic Society. 31 (3): 535–544. doi:10.1017/S1356186320000759. S2CID 234177980.
- Häberl, Charles G. (2021). "Mandaic and the Palestinian Question". Journal of the American Oriental Society. 141 (1): 171–184. doi:10.7817/jameroriesoci.141.1.0171. S2CID 234204741.
- Häberl, Charles G. (2022). Kaplan, Jonathan; Pat-El, Na'ama (eds.). "Meryey, Standing at the Boundary, in Zimrat JAH: A Tribute to Jo Anne Hackett". Maarav. 25 (1–2). Rolling Hills Estates, CA: Western Academic Press: 65–89. doi:10.1086/MAR202125106.
- Häberl, Charles G. (2023). "Binding the Lion: Numerology in the Mandaean Tradition". SSRN Electronic Journal. Elsevier BV. doi:10.2139/ssrn.4502834. ISSN 1556-5068. SSRN 4502834.

Book chapters

- Häberl, Charles G. (2012). "Neo-Mandaic". The Semitic Languages: An International Handbook. Berlin-Boston: Walter de Gruyter. pp. 725–737. ISBN 9783110251586.
- Häberl, Charles G. (2023). "Hebraisms in Mandaic". Linguistic and Philological Studies of the Hebrew Bible and its Manuscripts. Brill. pp. 26–49. doi:10.1163/9789004544840_004. ISBN 978-90-04-54484-0.
