= Syriology =

Syriology may refer to:

- the study of ancient Syria (region)
- Syriac studies
- the study of contemporary Syria
