= Rubens Duval =

French orientalist (1839–1911)

- Born: 25 October 1839; Morsang-sur-Seine
- Died: 10 May 1911 (aged 71); Morsang-sur-Seine
- Occupation: Scholar

Rubens Duval (25 October 1839 – 10 May 1911) was a French orientalist, specialising in the Aramaic language.

== Biography ==
Upon returning from a trip to Germany, where he studied for two years, the course of Heinrich Ewald at the University of Göttingen (1867–1869), he devoted himself entirely to the study of Semitic languages, especially Aramaic. Appointed professor of Aramaic languages and literatures at the Collège de France in 1895 (inaugural lecture April 23), he held this chair until 1907, when his health forced him to resign.

He belonged to the Société Asiatique from 1879, became a member of its Council in 1884, and held the posts of librarian and assistant secretary from 1889 to 1892 before becoming manager of the Journal asiatique. He became vice president of the Society in 1908, although he was at the time declined by illness. After he resigned from this office, he was awarded the title of Honorary President on November 11, 1910. He contributed himself to the Asian Journal by twenty articles and hundreds of bibliographic records.

He was also a member of the Société de linguistique de Paris (and of its Publications Committee), a member of the Council of the League of Jewish Studies, and a regular member of the German Oriental Society (Deutsche Gesellschaft Morgenländische).

== Main publications ==
- 1881: Traité de grammaire syriaque, Paris, Vieweg.
- 1883: Les dialectes néo-araméens de Salamas. Textes sur l'état actuel de la Perse et contes populaires, publiés avec une traduction française, Paris, Vieweg.
- Lexicon syriacum auctore Bar Bahlul, voces syriacas græcasque cum glossis syriacis et arabicis complectens, Paris, Imprimerie nationale, 6 fasc. (1888, 1890, 1892, 1894, 1897, 1900). In this work he proposed to identify Ishoʿ of Merv with Zechariah of Merv.
- 1892: Histoire politique, religieuse et littéraire d'Édesse jusqu'à la première croisade, Paris, Ernest Leroux.
- 1893: L'alchimie syriaque, comprenant une introduction et plusieurs traités d'alchimie syriaques et arabes d'après les mss. du British Museum and Cambridge, text and translation (forme le tome II de La chimie au Moyen Âge, under the leadership of Marcellin Berthelot), Paris, Imprimerie nationale.
- 1895: Les littératures araméennes (Inaugural lecture from his chair at the Collège de France), Paris, É. Leroux.
- 1899: La littérature syriaque (Bibliothèque de l'enseignement de l'histoire ecclésiastique. Anciennes littératures chrétiennes, II), Paris, Lecoffre; 2e éd., 1900; 3e éd., 1907 (réimpr. Amsterdam, Philo Press, 1970).
- 1904–05Išo'yahb III Patriarcha. Liber Epistularum, CSCO 11/12 (Script. Syri 11/12), Syriac and Latin, Paris.
- 1907: Severus of Antioch. Homiliæ cathedrales (Homélies LII à LVII) (in the Syriac translation by Jacob of Edessa), PO 15 (t. IV, fasc. 1), Paris, Didot.
- Notice sur le dialecte de Ma'loula, Journal asiatique, VIIe série, t. XIII, 1879, p. 456-475.
- Inscriptions syriaques de Salamas en Perse, reproduction prints, text, translation and notes, Journal asiatique, T. V, 1885, p. 39-62.
- 1889: Le patriarche Mar Jabalaha III et les princes Mongols de l'Azerbaïdjan, Journal asiatique, T. XIII, p. 313-354.
- 1901: Le Testament de saint Éphrem. Introduction, texte et traduction », Journal asiatique, T. XVIII, p. 234-319.
