= Neo-Mandaic =

Modern Mandaean language from West Asia

- Mandɔyí
- Pronunciation: [mændɔːˈji]
- Native to: Iran, formerly Iraq
- Ethnicity: Mandaeans
- Native speakers: 200 (2014)
- Language family: Afro-Asiatic: Semitic; Central Semitic; Northwest Semitic; Aramaic; Eastern Aramaic; Mandaic; Neo-Mandaic
- Early forms: Proto-Afroasiatic: Proto-Semitic; Old Aramaic; Middle Aramaic; Eastern Middle Aramaic; Mandaic
- Writing system: Mandaic alphabet

Language codes
- ISO 639-3: mid
- Glottolog: nucl1706
- ELP: Neo-Mandaic

Neo-Mandaic, also known as Modern Mandaic, sometimes called the "ratna" (Arabic: رطنة raṭna "jargon"), is the modern reflex of the Mandaic language, the liturgical language of the Mandaean religious community of Iraq and Iran. Although severely endangered, it survives as the first language of a small number of Mandaeans (possibly as few as 100–200 speakers) in Iran and in the Mandaean diaspora. All Neo-Mandaic speakers are multilingual in the languages of their neighbors, Arabic and Persian, and the influence of these languages upon the grammar of Neo-Mandaic is considerable, particularly in the lexicon and the morphology of the noun. Nevertheless, Neo-Mandaic is more conservative even in these regards than most other Neo-Aramaic languages.

An oral history of the Mandaic language.

== General information ==
Neo-Mandaic (ISO 639-3: mid) represents the latest stage of the development of Classical Mandaic, a language of the Middle East which was first attested during the period of Late Antiquity and which continues to be used to the present date by the Mandaean religious community of Iraq and Iran. While the members of this community, numbered at roughly 70,000 or fewer adherents throughout the world, are familiar with the classical dialect through their sacred literature and liturgy, only a few hundred Mandaeans, located primarily in Iran, speak Neo-Mandaic (known to them as the raṭnɔ) as a first language. Two surviving dialects of Neo-Mandaic have thus far been documented, those of Ahwāz (in Macuch 1965a, Macuch 1965b, Macuch 1989, and Macuch 1993) and Khorramshahr (in Häberl 2009). These dialects are mutually intelligible to the extent that speakers of either dialect will deny that there are any differences between the two.

Today, Neo-Mandaic is spoken almost exclusively in Ahvaz, Iran and in Western Sydney, Australia. Many of them are members of the priestly Choheili family.

=== Genetic affiliation ===
Neo-Mandaic is a dialect of Aramaic, a Northwest Semitic language that was formerly spoken throughout the Middle East. Already in antiquity, a split had developed between the Western dialects of Aramaic (spoken in primarily in Syria, Lebanon, Jordan, and Israel), and the Eastern dialects (spoken primarily in Mesopotamia and Iran) to which Neo-Mandaic pertains.

The bulk of scholarship on these modern reflexes of these dialects, collectively described as Neo-Aramaic, has focused primarily on Eastern Aramaic languages, particularly the Central Neo-Aramaic (Turoyo and Mlahsô) and Northeastern Neo-Aramaic (NENA) dialects spoken by Jewish and Christian communities in north-east Syria, northern Iraq, and north-west Iran.

A smaller but still considerable volume of scholarship is dedicated to the more peripheral dialects such as the Western Neo-Aramaic dialects spoken by Christians and Muslims in three villages near Damascus, and Neo-Mandaic. Of all the dialects that have thus far been documented, only Neo-Mandaic can be described with any certainty as the modern reflex of any classical written form of Aramaic.

=== History of scholarship ===
The first attempt at documenting Neo-Mandaic, a polyglot glossary including a column of lexical items from the Neo-Mandaic dialect of Basra, was produced roughly 350 years ago by a Carmelite missionary whom Borghero has identified with the Discalced Carmelite Matteo di San Giuseppe. This Glossarium was to have a perennial influence upon subsequent generations of Mandaeologists; it was consulted by Theodor Nöldeke and Rudolf Macúch in the preparation of their grammars, and the contents of its Neo-Mandaic column were incorporated into Drower and Macuch's 1963 dictionary. No complete Neo-Mandaic text was published until the beginning of the twentieth century, when de Morgan published five documents collected in Iran (transliterated and translated by Macuch). The last few decades have seen a marked increase in the number of Neo-Mandaic texts available to scholarship (Macuch 1965b, 1989, and 1993) and a descriptive grammar (Häberl 2009).

=== Writing system ===
Neo-Mandaic is generally unwritten. On the rare occasions on which it is written, in personal letters and in the colophons that are attached to manuscripts, it is rendered using a modified version of the classical script. With the exception of /ə/, all vowels are represented, but without any indication of length or quality. The letter ʕ consistently represents an epenthetic vowel, either /ə/ or /ɛ/. Additionally, the Arabic letter ع has been borrowed to indicate the voiced pharyngeal fricative as well as the glottal stop. The letters b, g, k, p, and t may represent stops (/b/, /ɡ/, /k/, /p/, and /t/) or fricatives (/v/, /ʁ/, /χ/, /f/, and /θ/). Formerly the fricatives were not distinctive segments but merely allophones of the stops after a vowel; the sound rule governing this alternation is now defunct. Neo-Mandaic orthography differs from that of Classical Mandaic by using u to represent /w/ even when it is a reflex of Classical Mandaic b. As Neo-Mandaic contains several phonemes not found in Classical Mandaic, several letters from the original script have been modified with two dots placed below to represent these phonemes: š may represent /tʃ/, /ʒ/, or /dʒ/, d represents /ðˤ/, and h represents /ħ/. Private Mandaic schools in Iran and Australia employ a version of this same script with a few further pedagogic modifications.

== Phonology ==
There are 35 distinctive segments in Neo-Mandaic: 28 consonants and seven vowels. For most of these segments, there is a relatively wide degree of allophonic variation. The transcription system, which is phonemic, does not reflect this variation; nor does it reflect sporadic assimilations, deletions, and other features that are typical of allegro speech.

=== Consonants ===
Neo-Mandaic has 28 distinctive consonantal segments, including four loan-phonemes: the postalveolar affricates č /tʃ/ and j /dʒ/ and the pharyngeal fricatives ʿ /ʕ/ and ḥ /ħ/, which are found only in vocabulary of foreign origin, particularly Arabic and Persian. Two pharyngealized segments (a voiced alveolar stop ḍ /ðˤ/ and a voiced alveolar fricative ẓ /zˤ/) are found in a few Arabic loan words. They have been excluded from the phonemic inventory of Neo-Mandaic due to their marginal status.

Voiceless stops are lightly aspirated.

Table 1: Neo-Mandaic Consonant Inventory
		Labial	Dental	Alveolar		Palatal	Velar	Uvular	Pharyngeal	Glottal
		Labial	Dental	plain	emphatic	Palatal	Velar	Uvular	Pharyngeal	Glottal
Stop/ Affricate	voiceless	p		t	tˤ	(tʃ (č))	k	q		
Stop/ Affricate	voiced	b		d		(dʒ (j))	ɡ			
Fricative	voiceless	f	θ (th)	s	sˤ (ṣ)	ʃ (sh)		χ (kh)	(ħ (ḥ))	h
Fricative	voiced	v		z				ʁ (gh)	(ʕ (ʿ))	
Nasal		m		n						
Trill				r						
Approximant		w		l		j (y)				

=== Vowels ===
Table 2: Neo-Mandaic Vowel Inventory
	Front	Central	Back
Close	i		u
Mid	e	(ə)	o
Open		a	ɒ

The vowel system in Neo-Mandaic is composed of seven distinct vowels, of which six (i /i/, u /u/, e /e/, o /o/, a /a/, and ɔ /ɒ/) are principal phonemes, and one (ə /ə/) is marginal. The vowels are distinguished by quality rather than quantity. Three of the principal vowels, the "tense" vowels i, u, and ɔ, are lengthened in open accented syllables to [iː], [uː], and [ɔː] or [ɒː]. /i/ and /u/ are realized as [ɪ] and [ʌ] whenever they occur in closed syllables, either accented or unaccented (exceptions are Persian loanwords (e.g. gush "ear") and contextual forms such as asut, from asuta "health"). The other three principle vowels, the "lax" vowels o, e, and a, appear only exceptionally in open accented syllables. /e/ is realized as [e] in open syllables and [ɛ] in closed syllables. /o/ is realized as [oː] in open syllables and as [ʌ] in closed syllables. /a/ is realized as [ɑ] in closed accented syllables, and as [a] or [æ] elsewhere. Schwa (ə) has the widest allophonic variation of all the vowels. It is regularly fronted, backed, raised, or lowered in harmony with the vowel of the following syllable. When it is followed by /w/, it is regularly raised and backed to [ʌ]. When the accent falls on a closed syllable containing schwa, it becomes fronted and raised to [ɛ].

There are also five diphthongs, ey /ɛɪ/, ay /aɪ/, aw /aʊ/, ɔy /ɔɪ/, and ɔw /ɔʊ/. The diphthongs /aɪ/ and /aʊ/, which had already collapsed in closed accented syllables to /i/ and /u/ in the classical language, have collapsed in all accented syllables in the dialects of Ahwāz and Khorramshahr, apart from those in words of foreign origin. The collapse of diphthongs appears to be further advanced in the dialect of Ahvāz; compare Khorramshahr gɔw /ɡɔʊ/ 'in' with Ahwāz gu /ɡuː/ id. Closely tied to the collapse of the diphthong /aɪ/ in open accented syllables is the breaking of its outcome, /iː/ to /iɛ̆/ in the same environment. For example, classical baita 'house' has become bieṯɔ in Neo-Mandaic. This sound change is today typical of both the contemporary dialects of Ahwāz and Khorramshahr, but is not present in the unpublished texts from Iraq collected by Drower or in Macuch 1989.

=== Syllable structure ===
Neo-Mandaic words range in size from one to five syllables. Each syllable consists of an onset (which is optional in word-initial syllables) and a rime. The rime consists of a nucleus (usually a vowel or a syllabic consonant) with or without a coda. The onset and the coda which frame the nucleus consist of consonants; the onset is mandatory for all word-internal syllables, but the coda is optional in all environments. Whenever an enclitic pronominal suffix (see 3.3. below) lacking an onset is added to a closed accented syllable, the coda of the syllable is geminated to form the onset of the following syllable. Whenever the voiceless interdental fricative /θ/ is geminated in this environment, its outcome is the cluster [χt] rather than the expected [θθ]. For example, when the pronominal suffixes are appended directly to the existential particle *eṯ [ɛθ] (Classical ‘it), it regularly takes the form ext- [ɛχt]. This rule affects the conjugation of the verb meṯ ~ moṯ (mɔyeṯ) ‘to die,’ e.g. meṯ ‘he died’ but mextat ‘she died.’ It is also responsible for the modern form of the abstract ending uxtɔ (Classical -uta).

The syllable patterns V (ɔ [ɔ] ‘this’), VC (ax [ɑχ] ‘that’), CV (mu [mu] ‘what’), and CVC (tum [tum] ‘then’) are the most common. Slightly less common are syllables containing clusters of consonantal or vocalic segments, such as VCC (ahl [ahl] ‘family’), CCV (klɔṯɔ [ˈklɔː.θɔ] ‘three’), CCVC (ṣṭɔnye [ˈstɔn.je] ‘he is a boy’), CVCC (waxt [væχt] ‘time’), CVVC (bieṯ [biɛ̆θ] ‘house’), and even CVVCC (šieltxon [ˈʃiɛ̆lt.χon] ‘I asked you (pl.)’). Permissible consonant clusters in Neo-Mandaic fall into two categories: clusters that form at the beginning or the end of a syllable, and those that span syllable boundaries. The former are strictly limited to certain combination of segments. The latter are less restricted; with few exceptions, Neo-Mandaic tolerates most clusters of two or occasionally even three consonants across a syllable boundary. Consonant clusters consisting of a stop followed by a sonorant, a sibilant followed by a sonorant, or a sibilant followed by a stop, are tolerated in both syllable-final and syllable-initial environments. Consonant clusters consisting of a sonorant and a stop or a sonorant and a fricative are tolerated in word final environment alone. /ə/ is regularly inserted as an anaptyctic vowel to break up impermissible consonant clusters; whenever a sonorant is the second segment in a word-final consonant cluster, the cluster is eliminated by syllabifying the sonorant. Neo-Mandaic does not tolerate clusters of the bilabial nasal /m/ and the alveolar trill /r/ in any environment. The voiced bilabial stop /b/ regularly intervenes between these two segments, e.g. lákamri [ˈlɑ.kɑm.bri] ‘he didn’t return it.’ Clusters of the voiceless glottal fricative /h/ with another consonant are also not tolerated, even across a syllable boundary; /h/ is generally deleted in this environment.

=== Stress ===
The accent preferably falls upon a tense vowel within a closed syllable. The placement of the accent is determined from the final syllable. Any final syllable (or ultima) that is closed and contains a tense vowel automatically receives the accent, e.g. farwɔh [fær.ˈwɔh] ‘thanks.’ If the final is open or contains a lax vowel, the accent will fall upon the penultimate syllable, provided that it is closed or contains a tense vowel, e.g. gawrɔ [ˈgæv.rɔ] ‘man.’ Otherwise, the stress will fall on the final syllable, e.g. əxal [a.ˈχɑl] ‘he ate.’ In words of three or more syllables, if neither the ultima nor the penultima is closed and contains a tense vowel, then the accent recedes to the antepenultimate syllable, e.g. gaṭelnɔxon [ga.ˈtˤɛl.nɒ.ˌχon] ‘I will kill you.’ Several morphemes automatically take the accent, such as the negative morpheme lá-, which causes the accent to shift to the first syllable of the verb which is negated. As in Classical Mandaic and other Aramaic dialects, vowels in open pretonic syllables are regularly subject to reduction.

== Nouns ==
The morphology of the noun has been greatly influenced by contact with Persian. The classical system of states has become obsolete, and only vestiges of it survive in some frozen forms and grammatical constructions. As a result, the most common inflectional morphemes associated with the states have been replaced by morphemes borrowed from Persian, such as the plural morphemes ɔn (for native and nativized vocabulary) and -(h)ɔ (for words of foreign origin), the indefinite morpheme -i, and the ezɔfe.

This last morpheme indicates a relationship between two nouns (substantive or adjective) corresponding to a variety of functions (generally attributive or genitive). In Neo-Mandaic, the attributes of both the Iranian ezɔfe and its Classical Mandaic analogue are reconciled. Whenever a noun bearing the nominal augment –ɔ is immediately followed by another noun or adjective expressing a genitive or attributive relationship, the augment is regularly apocopated, e.g. rabbɔ ‘leader’ but rab Mandayɔnɔ ‘leader of the Mandaeans’ and kədɔwɔ ‘book’ but kədɔw Mandɔyí ‘a Mandaic book.’

=== Gender and number ===
Table 3: Number and Gender Marking in Neo-Mandaic
Gender	Singular	Gloss	Plural	Gloss
m	kədɔw-ɔ	book	kədaw-ɔn-ɔ	books
f	id-ɔ	hand	id-ɔn-ɔ	hands
f	tur-t-ɔ	cow	tur-ɔṯ-ɔ	cows
f	bieṯ-ɔ	house	bieṯ-wɔṯ-ɔ	houses
m	gawr-ɔ	man	gowr-ɔ	men
f	eṯṯ-ɔ	woman	enš-ɔ	women
m	jihel	child	jihel-ɔ	children
m	waxt	time	awqɔt	times

Despite the collapse of the system of states, and the obsolescence of the most common classical plural morpheme –ia, much of the morphology of the noun has been preserved. While most masculine and feminine nouns alike are marked with the plural morpheme -ɔn-, the grammar continues to mark a distinction between the two genders. The feminine plural morpheme -(w/y)ɔṯ- most commonly appears on nouns marked explicitly with the feminine singular morpheme -t-, although it can also be found on the plural forms of many feminine nouns not marked as such in the singular. Most loan words take the plural morpheme -(h)ɔ, although a few retain the plural forms of their source languages. Additionally, many of the heteroclite plurals attested in the classical language have been retained.

=== Identifiability and referentiality ===
Table 4: Pragmatic Status of the Noun
	Specific	Non-Specific	Generic	Identifiable	Gloss
barnɔš-ɔ		-		+	people / the person
barnɔš-i			-	-	a person
barneš-ɔn-ɔ			-	+	the people
barneš-ɔn-i			-	-	some (of the) people
əl-barnɔš-ɔ	+			+	the person / people
əl-barnɔš-i	+			-	a (specific) person
əl-barnaš-ɔn-ɔ	+			+	the (specific) people
əl-barnaš-ɔn-i	+			-	some (specific) people

The appearance of the indefinite and plural morphemes on the noun is determined primarily by its pragmatic status, such as the referentiality and identifiability of the referent. "Referentiality" concerns whether the speaker intends a particular, specific entity, which is thus referential, or whether the entity is designated as non-specific or generic, and thus non-referential. Referential nouns are explicitly marked when plural as well as when they serve as the object of a verb, in which case they are marked with the enclitic morpheme əl and anticipated by a pronominal suffix on the verb. The referent of an unmarked noun such as barnɔšɔ can either be specific (‘the person’) or generic (‘people’) but not non-specific (‘a person’). The "identifiability" of a referent reflects whether the speaker assumes that it is identifiable or unidentifiable to the addressee. The indefinite morpheme –i indicates that the referent is neither generic nor identifiable, but is ambiguous as to whether the referent is specific (‘a particular person’) or non-specific (‘some person’). Macuch (1965a, 207) has noted that this morpheme, originally borrowed from the Iranian languages, is attested already in the Classical Mandaic texts. Nouns and adjectives modified by the indefinite morpheme -i can serve as indefinite pronouns to indicate non-specific or indefinite referents (such as enši ‘someone’ and mendi ‘something’).

== Pronouns ==
Table 5: Personal Pronouns (and Suffixes)
person	m.sg.	f.sg.	pl.
3rd	huwi / -i	hidɔ / -a	honni / -u
2nd	ɔt / -ax	ɔt / -ex	atton / -xon
1st	anɔ / -e		ani / -an

There are five types of pronouns in Neo-Mandaic: personal pronouns (both independent and enclitic), demonstrative pronouns, indefinite pronouns (introduced in 3.2. above), interrogative pronouns, and relativizers (introduced in 6. below). The personal pronouns are illustrated to the right.

The independent personal pronouns are optionally employed to represent the subject of a transitive or intransitive verb. Whenever the singular forms appear before a verb, their final vowel is apocopated. The enclitic personal pronouns are in complementary distribution with them; they may represent the object of a transitive verb, a nominal or verbal complement or adjunct in a prepositional phase, or indicate possession on the noun. On nouns of foreign origin, they are affixed by means of the morpheme –d-. On the noun napš- ‘self’ they also serve to form the reflexive pronouns. Neo-Mandaic also has two reciprocal pronouns, ham ‘each other’ and hədɔdɔ ‘one another.’

Table 6: The Demonstrative Pronouns
Near Deixis			Far Deixis
Isolated	Contextual	Gloss	Isolated	Contextual	Gloss
ɔhɔ	ɔ	this	axu	ax	that
ahni		these	ahni		those

Neo-Mandaic demonstrative pronouns distinguish between near-deixis and far-deixis in the singular, but not in the plural. They also reflect no distinction in gender. The original far-deictic plural demonstrative pronoun ahni ‘those’ (classical hania) has assumed the function of a general plural demonstrative pronoun. It is also often used in the place of the independent third plural personal pronoun. The demonstrative pronouns precede the noun they modify. In this position, the final vowel of the singular demonstratives is apocopated (these are the forms listed as ‘contextual,’ e.g. ɔ šeršɔnɔ ‘these religions’). Note that the plural demonstrative does not appear in the contextual form; instead, the singular forms are used before plural nouns (the plural morpheme indicating plurality on the whole noun phrase). Neo-Mandaic also has two locative demonstrative pronouns, hənɔ / ehnɔ ‘here’ and ekkɔx ‘there.’

The interrogative pronouns are used to elicit specific information beyond a simple yes or no answer (which can be elicited simply by employing a rising intonation, as in English). Of these interrogative pronouns, only man ‘who’ and mu ‘what’ may substitute for either the subject or the object of a verb, obligatorily appearing at the beginning of the interrogative clause. Other interrogatives in Neo-Mandaic include elyɔ ‘where,’ hem ‘which,’ hemdɔ ‘when,’ kammɔ ‘how,’ kaṯkammɔ ‘how much/many,’ mojur ‘how, in what way,’ and qamu ‘why.’

== Verbs ==
The Neo-Mandaic verb may appear in two aspects (perfective and imperfective), three moods (indicative, subjunctive, and imperative), and three voices (active, middle, and passive). As in other Semitic languages, the majority of verbs are built upon a triconsonantal root, each of which may yield one or more of six verbal stems: the G-stem or basic stem, the D-stem or transitivizing-denominative verbal stem, the C-stem or causative verbal stem, and the tG-, tD-, and tC-stems, to which a derivational morpheme, t-, was prefixed before the first root consonant. This morpheme has disappeared from all roots save for those possessing a sibilant as their initial radical, such as eṣṭəwɔ ~ eṣṭəwi (meṣṭəwi) ‘to be baptized’ in the G-stem or eštallam ~ eštallam (meštallam) in the C-stem, in which the stop and the sibilant are metathesized. A seventh stem, the Q-stem, is reserved exclusively for those verbs possessing four root consonants.

Verbs that begin with a vowel rather than a consonant are called I-weak. Verbs beginning with the approximants n and y, which were susceptible to assimilation in Classical Mandaic, have been reformed on the analogy of the strong verbs. When they appear as the second or third radical of a consonantal root, the liquids w and y are susceptible to the general collapse of diphthongs described above. The verbs that are thus affected are known as II-weak and III-weak verbs. Those roots in which the second and third radical consonants were identical have been reformed on the analogy of the II-weak verbs; this process had already begun in Classical Mandaic.

A very large and productive class of verbs in Neo-Mandaic consists of a verbal element and a non-verbal element, which form a single semantic and syntactic unit. The non-verbal element is most often a noun such as əwɔdɔ ‘deed’ in the compound əwɔdɔ əwad ~ əwod (ɔwed) ‘to work or to do something,’ or an adjective such as həyɔnɔ ‘alive’ in the compound həyɔnɔ tammɔ ‘to survive,’ although prepositions such as qɔr ‘at,’ in the compound qɔr tammɔ ‘to be born to s.o.,’ are attested. In many of these compounds, the verbal element is a "light" verb, which serves only to indicate verbal inflections such as person, tense, mood, and aspect; the meaning of these compounds is primarily derived from the non-verbal element, which always precedes the verbal element. The most common light verbs are əwad ~ əwod (ɔwed) ‘to do,’ əhaw ~ əhow (ɔhew) ‘to give,’ məhɔ ~ məhi (mɔhi) ‘to hit,’ and tammɔ ‘to become.’ Although phrasal verbs similar to these are attested in Classical Mandaic, most Neo-Mandaic phrasal verbs are calqued upon Persian phrasal verbs, and many non-verbal elements are Persian or Arabic loan words.

=== Principal parts of the verb ===
Table 7: The Principal Parts of the Seven Stems
Stem	Perfective	Imperative	Imperfective	Gloss
G-stem (a~o)	gəṭal	gəṭol	gɔṭel	to kill
G-stem (e~o)	dəhel	dəhol	dɔhel	to be afraid
G-stem (o~o)	šəxow	šəxow	šɔxew	to lie down
tG-stem	epseq	epseq	mepseq	to be cut off
D-stem	kammer	kammer	əmkammer	to (re)turn
tD-stem	kammar	kammar	mekammar	to turn back
C-stem	ahrew	ahrew	mahrew	to destroy
tC-stem	ettar	ettar	mettar	to wake up
Q-stem	bašqer	bašqer	əmbašqer	to know

The principal parts upon which all inflected forms of the verb are built are the perfective base (represented by the third masculine singular form of the perfective), the imperative base (represented by the masculine singular form of the imperative), and the imperfective base (represented by the active participle in the absolute state). In the G-stem, the second syllable of the perfective base can have one of three thematic vowels: /a/, /e/, and /o/. Transitive verbs predominantly belong to the first, which is the most common of the three, whereas the latter two typically characterize intransitives and stative verbs. Transitive verbs also commonly yield a passive participle, which takes the form CəCil, e.g. gəṭil ‘killed (m.sg.),’ f.sg. gəṭilɔ and pl. gəṭilen. The D-stem is represented by one passive participle, əmšabbɔ ‘praised,’ which belongs to the III-weak root consonant class. The C-stem is also represented by a single III-weak passive participle, maḥwɔ ‘kept.’

=== Inflected forms of the verb ===
Table 8: Personal Suffixes on the Verb
	Singular			Plural
Person	Perfective	Imperative	Imperfective	Perfective	Imperative	Imperfective
3 m	-Ø		-Ø	-yon		-en
3 f	-at		-ɔ	(-yɔn)
2 m	-t	-Ø	-et	-ton	-yon	-etton
2 f	(-it)	-Ø		(-ten)	(-yen)
1	-it		-nɔ	-ni		-enni

The inflected forms of the verbs are produced by adding personal suffixes to the principal parts. The forms given in parentheses were cited by Macuch, who noted that they were infrequently found and not consistently used. The feminine plural forms were not present at all in the texts collected by Häberl, and it would appear that the paradigm is in the process of being leveled towards the masculine forms. Before personal morphemes beginning with a vowel, the vowel of the syllable immediately preceding the suffix is deleted and the former coda becomes the onset for the new syllable. The addition of the morpheme may also cause the accent to shift, resulting in the reduction of vowels in pretonic syllables noted in 2.4. Enclitic object suffixes, introduced above, also have the same effect upon preceding syllables, affecting the form of the personal morpheme. All third person imperfective forms take the enclitic object marker -l- before the object suffix. The final consonant of the third plural personal suffix -en regularly assimilates to this enclitic object marker, producing the form -el(l)-. Additionally, the second singular and first plural morphemes assume the forms -ɔt- and -nan(n)- respectively before object suffixes.

=== Tense, aspect, mood, and voice ===
Aspect is as basic to the Neo-Mandaic verbal system as tense; the inflected forms derived from the participle are imperfective, and as such indicate habitual actions, progressive or inchoative actions, and actions in the future from a past or present perspective. The perfective forms are not only preterite but also resultative-stative, which is most apparent from the verbs relating to a change of state, e.g. mextat eštɔ ‘she is dead now,’ using the perfective of meṯ ~ moṯ (mɔyeṯ) ‘to die.’

The indicative is used to make assertions or declarations about situations which the speaker holds to have happened (or, conversely, have not happened), or positions which he maintains to be true. It is also the mood used for questions and other interrogative statements. The perfective, by its very nature, refers to situations that the speaker holds to have happened or not to have happened, and thus pertains to the indicative, apart from explicitly counterfactual conditional clauses, e.g. agar an láhwit, lá-aṯṯat əl-yanqɔ ‘if I hadn’t been there, she wouldn’t have brought (=given birth to) the baby.’ The imperfective, on the other hand, is used to describe situations which are ongoing, have yet to happen, or about which there may exist some uncertainty or doubt. When marked by the morpheme qə-, it is used to express the indicative, but when it is not thus marked, it expresses the subjunctive. The subjunctive is most commonly used to indicate wishes, possibilities, obligations, and any other statements which may be contrary to present fact. As in the other Semitic languages, the subjunctive must be used in the place of the imperative for all negative commands and prohibitions.

In Neo-Mandaic, the relationship of the action or state described by the verb to its arguments can be described by one of three voices: active, middle voice, and passive. When the action described by the verb is initiated by its grammatical subject, the verb is described as being in the active voice, and the grammatical subject is described as its agent. The t-stems introduced above express the middle voice. The agents of verbs in these stems, which are syntactically active and intransitive, experience the results of these actions as if they were also the patient; in many cases, the action of the verb appears to occur on its own. As a result, verbs in these stems are often translated as if they were agentless passives, or reflexive actions that the subject takes on its own behalf, e.g. etwer minni wuṣle ‘a piece broke off / was broken from it.’ In the passive voice, the grammatical subject of the verb is the recipient of the action described by it, namely the patient. There are two ways of forming the passive voice in Neo-Mandaic: the analytic passive, in which the passive participle is combined with the copula, and the much more common impersonal passive, in which an impersonal third plural form is used, e.g. əmaryon ‘it is said,’ literally ‘they said.’

== Syntax ==
Neo-Mandaic preserves the SVO word order of Classical Mandaic, despite its longstanding contact with Persian (which follows SOV word order). Topic-fronting, which tends to obscure the word order, is typical of all three languages. Simple sentences consist of a subject, which may be implied in the verb, and a predicate, which is headed by a verb or the copula (see Table 9 below). The independent forms of the copula introduce predicate nominal and predicate locative constructions, and the enclitic forms introduce predicate adjectives. Much like other Semitic languages, Neo-Mandaic employs a predicate locative construction to express the notion of possession. In the simple present tense, this construction uses the independent form of the existential particle *eṯ and the preposition l- ‘to/for,’ which takes the enclitic suffixes introduced in Table 5. Before l-, the existential particle assumes the form eh-, yielding the forms ehli ‘he has’ (lit. ‘there is for him’), ehla ‘she has,’ and so forth. In tenses other than the simple present, the copular verb həwɔ ~ həwi (hɔwi) is used in the place of the existential particle, e.g. agar pərɔhɔ həwɔle, turti zawnit ‘if I had money, I would have bought a cow.’

Compound sentences combine two or more simple sentences with coordinating conjunctions such as u ‘and,’ ammɔ ‘but,’ lo ‘or,’ and the correlative conjunction -lo … -lo ‘either … or.’ Complex sentences consist of a main clause and one or more dependent clauses introduced by a relative pronoun, provided that the referent of the antecedent of the clause is definite—if it is indefinite, no relative pronoun is used. The Classical Mandaic relative pronoun ḏ- has not survived, having been replaced by elli, an Arabic loan that introduces non-restrictive relative clauses, and ke, a Persian loan that introduces restrictive relative clauses, both of which appear immediately following the antecedent of the clause. The antecedents of restrictive relative clauses are marked with the restrictive morpheme –i, which resembles the indefinite morpheme in form alone, e.g. ezgit dukkɔni ke həzitu awwál ‘I went to the places which I saw before.’ If the antecedent is the object of the relative clause, it will be represented within the relative clause by a resumptive relative pronoun, as in the example above (həzitu ‘I saw them’).

== Variation among individual speakers ==
There is noticeable variation in pronunciation, lexicon, and morphology among individual speakers of Neo-Mandaic. For example, below are some words and phrases with different forms as noted by Häberl (2009). (Charles G. Häberl worked with Nasser Sobbi in 2003, while Rudolf Macúch worked with Salem Choheili in 1989 and Nasser Saburi in 1953.)

English	Nasser Sobbi (Khorramshahr/ New York, 2003)	Salem Choheili (Ahvaz, 1989)	Nasser Saburi (Ahvaz, 1953)
house	bieṯ	bieṯ	beṯ
water	mienā	mienā	menā
time	waxt	vaxt	waqt
come (pl.)!	doṯon	diyöṯōn	doṯōn
three	klāṯā	tlāṯā	klāṯā
with	orke	mork	orke
which	illi	ke	ke

Other fluent native speakers of Neo-Mandaic include Salah Choheili (the rishama or Mandaean head priest in Australia) and many of his family members.

== Comparison ==
The ensemble of the features described above suggest that the grammar of Neo-Mandaic is remarkably conservative in comparison with that of Classical Mandaic, and that most of the features that distinguish the former from the latter (in particular, the restructuring of the nominal morphology and the verbal system) are the result of developments already attested in Classical and Postclassical Mandaic. Unlike the other Neo-Aramaic dialects (apart from Western Neo-Aramaic), Neo-Mandaic alone preserves the old Semitic suffix conjugation (the Neo-Mandaic perfective).

Apart from the imperative forms, the prefix conjugation (the Classical Mandaic imperfect) has been replaced by the Neo-Mandaic imperfective, which was already anticipated in Classical Mandaic as well. Even the lexicon preserves the vocabulary of Classical Mandaic to a large degree; in a list of 207 of the most common terms in Neo-Mandaic collected by Häberl, over 85% were also attested in the classical language, the remaining 15% deriving primarily from Arabic and Persian. As the latest stage of a classical Aramaic dialect with a long and fairly continuous history of attestation, Neo-Mandaic is potentially of great value for elucidating the typology of the Aramaic dialects as well as the study of the Semitic languages in general.

== See also ==
- Mandaeism
- Mandaic alphabet
- Neo-Aramaic languages
- Neo-Mandaic Swadesh list on Wiktionary
