= Susan Ashbrook Harvey =

Late antique and Byzantine Christian scholar

- Born: 1953 (age 72–73); Rochester, New York, United States
- Awards: Guggenheim Fellowship (2008)

Academic background
- Education: BA Classics, 1975; Grinnell College; MLitt Byzantine Studies, 1977; PhD, 1982; University of Birmingham
- Thesis: Asceticism and Society: A Study in John of Ephesus' Lives of the Eastern Saints (1982)
- Doctoral advisor: Sebastian Brock

Academic work
- Discipline: Byzantine studies; Early Christian studies
- Institutions: Brown University

Susan Ashbrook Harvey (born 1953) is the Royce Family Professor of Teaching Excellence and the Willard Prescott and Annie McClelland Smith Professor of History and Religion at Brown University. She specializes in late antique and Byzantine Christianity, with Syriac studies as her particular focus.

== Career ==
Harvey was born Susan Jean Ashbrook in 1953 in Rochester, New York to a Baptist seminary professor. She cites her Christian upbringing as a source of inspiration for her research. Harvey received her BA in Classics from Grinnell College in 1975. In 1977, she followed this with a Master of Letters in Byzantine studies from the University of Birmingham and then a PhD at the same institution in 1982. Her thesis was supervised by Sebastian Brock, one of the foremost experts in the Syriac language and a source of inspiration for Harvey's later interest in Syriac Christianity. From 1983 to 1987, she was Assistant Professor of Religious Studies at the University of Rochester. In 1987, she joined the faculty of Brown University.

Harvey's work focuses on the social aspects of Christianity, particularly issues affecting women. She has researched the variety of roles women played in the ancient church, and highlighted the many women saints emerging from all walks of life. According to Ross Shepard Kræmer, "Susan Harvey has almost single-handedly established an entire sub-field of studies on women and gender in the Syrian Orient". Harvey has also published widely on topics relating to asceticism, hagiography, hymnography, homiletics, and piety in late antique Christianity. In recognition of this and other work, she was awarded an honorary Doctor of Humane Letters from Grinnell College in 2007. She was also awarded Doctor theologiæ, honoris causa, from Lund University in May 2013 and Doctor theologiæ, honoris causa, from the University of Bern in December 2009. In 2007–2008 she was the recipient of a Guggenheim fellowship to work on biblical women and women's choirs in Syriac Christianity. (Note: "Susan Ashbrook Harvey". John Simon Guggenheim Memorial Foundation.)

== Selected publications ==
- ———— (1990). Asceticism and Society in Crisis: John of Ephesus and the Lives of the Eastern Saints. Berkeley, California: University of California Press. ISBN 978-0-5200-6523-9. LCCN 89004822. OCLC 19455987. OL 2186739M.
- ———— (2006-06-07). Scenting Salvation: Ancient Christianity and the Olfactory Imagination. The transformation of the classical heritage. Vol. 42. Berkeley, California: University of California Press. ISBN 978-0-5202-4147-3. LCCN 2005013451. OCLC 470561240. OL 3399540M.
- ————; Hunter, David G., eds. (2008). Oxford Handbook of Early Christian Studies. Oxford, England: Oxford University Press. ISBN 978-0-1995-9652-2. OCLC 716754386. OL 24821829M.
