= Bzince pod Javorinou =

- Municipality
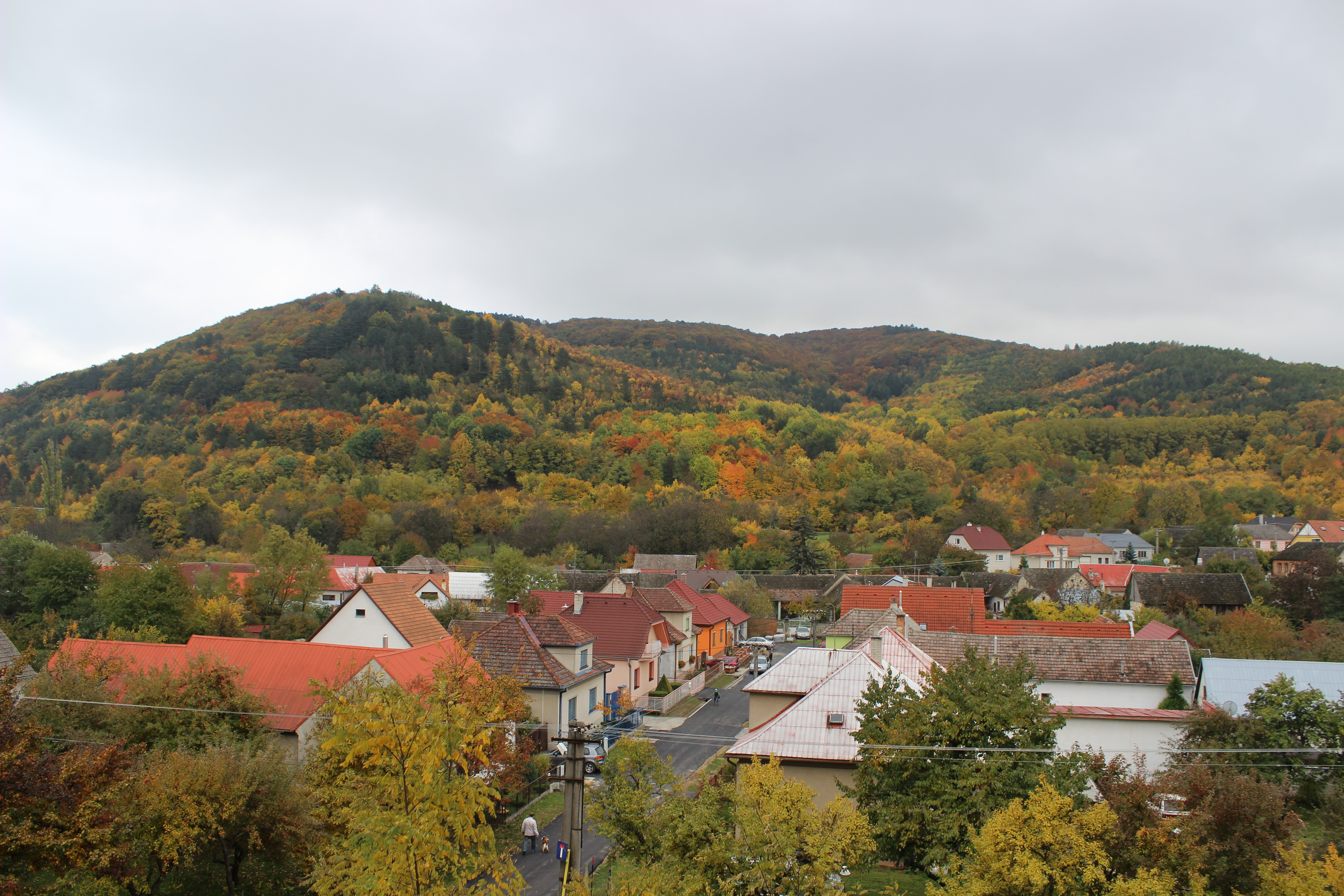

- Flag

- Location of Bzince pod Javorinou in the Trenčín Region Location of Bzince pod Javorinou in Slovakia
- Coordinates: 48.78°N 17.78°E
- Country: Slovakia
- Region: Trenčín Region
- District: Nové Mesto nad Váhom District
- First mentioned: 1332

Area
  - Total: 33.53 km^{2} (12.95 sq mi)
- Elevation: 292 m (958 ft)

Population (2025)
  - Total: 1,998
- Time zone: UTC+1 (CET)
  - Summer (DST): UTC+2 (CEST)
- Postal code: 916 11
- Area code: +421 32
- Vehicle registration plate (until 2022): NM
- Website: obecbzince.sk

Bzince pod Javorinou (Hungarian: Botfalu) is a village and municipality in Nové Mesto nad Váhom District in the Trenčín Region of western Slovakia.

== History ==
In historical records the village was first mentioned in 1332. Before the establishment of independent Czechoslovakia in 1918, Bzince pod Javorinou was part of Nyitra County within the Kingdom of Hungary. From 1939 to 1945, it was part of the Slovak Republic.

== Geography ==
The municipality lies at an altitude of 292 metres (958 ft) and covers an area of 33.53 km^{2} (12.95 sq mi) (2025).

== Population ==
Population statistic (10 years)
Year	1995	2005	2015	2025
Count	1975	2071	2089	1998
Difference		+4.86%	+0.86%	−4.35%

Population statistic
Year	2024	2025
Count	2024	1998
Difference		−1.28%

It has a population of 1998 people (31 December 2025).

=== Ethnicity ===
Census 2021 (1+ %)
Ethnicity	Number	Fraction
Slovak	1929	94.05%
Not found out	103	5.02%
Czech	40	1.95%
Total	2051	

In year 2021 was 2051 people by ethnicity 1929 as Slovak, 103 as Not found out, 40 as Czech, 8 as Other, 3 as Romani, 3 as Russian, 3 as German, 2 as Moravian, 2 as English, 1 as Ukrainian, 1 as Austrian, 1 as Polish, 1 as Hungarian and 1 as Croatian.

Note on population: The difference values of population numbers in the table "Population statistic" and in the sections "Ethnicity" & "Religion" is caused by the use of various statistical methods.

=== Religion ===
Census 2021 (1+ %)
Religion	Number	Fraction
Evangelical Church	780	38.03%
None	676	32.96%
Roman Catholic Church	464	22.62%
Not found out	94	4.58%
Total	2051	

In year 2021 was 2051 people by religion 780 from Evangelical Church, 676 from None, 464 from Roman Catholic Church, 94 from Not found out, 8 from Jehovah's Witnesses, 5 from Other, 5 from Ad hoc movements, 4 from Christian Congregations in Slovakia, 4 from Apostolic Church, 3 from Eastern Orthodox Church, 3 from United Methodist Church, 2 from Greek Catholic Church, 1 from Paganism and natural spirituality, 1 from Islam and 1 from Buddhism.

== Famous people ==
- Rudolf Macúch, linguist
- Ľudmila Podjavorinská, Slovak writer

== Genealogical resources ==
The records for genealogical research are available at the state archive "Statny Archiv in Bratislava, Slovakia"

- Roman Catholic church records (births/marriages/deaths): 1733-1938 (parish A)
- Lutheran church records (births/marriages/deaths): 1789-1952 (parish A)

== See also ==
- List of municipalities and towns in Slovakia
