= Hasan bar Bahlul =

Bishop and Scholar

Mār al-Ḥasan Bar Bahlul al-Awāni al-Ṭirhāni ܚܣܢ ܒܪ ܒܗܠܘܠ
- Church: Church of the East
- See: Seleucia-Ctesiphon

Personal details
- Born: 10th century Awāna near Baghdad, Abbasid Caliphate (modern-day Iraq)
- Profession: Bishop, scholar, lexicographer, historian

Hasan bar Bahlul (Syriac: ܚܣܢ ܒܪ ܒܗܠܘܠ), also called al-Ḥasan ibn Bahlul al-Awāni al-Ṭirhāni (Arabic: الحسن بن بهلول الاواني الطيرهاني) was a 10th-century Church of the East bishop, scholar and lexicographer from near Baghdad. Among his many works, he is best known for his Lexicon, a comprehensive Syriac reference work of technical, theological, and scientific terms that was widely circulated, edited, and translated.

== Life ==
Not much is known about his early life. Hasan Bahlul was born in Awana, nearly 60 km north of Baghdad. The region was called Tirhan, which gave him his nisba (nowadays a district of Samarra, Iraq). He spent most of his life in the Abbasid capital, interacting with various Christian and Muslim scholars in his lifetime, as the Christian intellectual milieu of the time was thoroughly bilingual in Syriac and Arabic. He supported Abdisho I's ascent to the patriarchy of the Church of the East in 963 AD.

== Works ==
During Bar Bahlul's lifetime, his church (Church of the East) had extended across all of Asia, reaching the shores of China and India

Bar Bahlul authored many works in his life, but two particularly stand out: his Lexicon and Book of Signs.

=== Lexicon ===
He is most famous for the composition of a lexicon (Syriac: ܠܝܟܣܝܩܘܢ, romanized: Leksiqon). It involves scholarly and technical terms, including both Syriac words and Greek words in Garshuni (Syriac transliteration). The explanations are usually in Syriac but include equivalents and brief comments in Arabic. Ordinary Syriac words are typically not included. The terms originate from the Bible in addition to theological, philosophical, and scientific literature. A few proper names are also included. The words are organized alphabetically, although Bar Bahlul sometimes clusters together the Syriac words derived from the same root.

Bar Bahlul also provides uncommon information on dialectal variation within the Syriac language in his own period, covering a range of regions such as Upper Mesopotamia, Lower Mesopotamia, Mosul, Edessa, Harran, and more. Many words, phrases, names, and titles of works are known only on account of his Lexicon, which was thus given the title of "linguistic and cultural encyclopedia”. Much of the information in the Lexicon comes from manuscripts from both the East- and West-Syriac traditions, and significant portions benefited the modern dictionaries of R. Payne Smith and Carl Brockelmann.

The Lexicon signifies the apex of the Syriac tradition of lexicography. In its composition, Bar Bahlul drew heavily upon two works of Hunayn ibn Ishaq (d. 873), one on homographs and a lexicon (puššāq šmāhe) now lost, and the lost lexicon of Ḥenanishoʿ bar Seroshway (c. 900). Bar Bahlul drew on these primary sources and his own expertise to include a diverse selection of Greek, Syriac, and Arabic authors and works in his Lexicon. These include Jacob of Serugh, Jacob of Edessa, and Moses bar Kepha, with non-Christian works like Story of Ahikar and Kalīla wa-Dimna.

=== Book of Signs ===
The newly discovered Book of Signs (Arabic: كتاب الدلائل, romanized: Kitāb al-dalāʾil), composed in Arabic sometime between 942 and 968, is also extensive like the Lexicon but its use was intended for travelers. It talks about issues of calendrical variations and, among other things, lists the festivals and commemorative days of Christians, Muslims (arranged according to the lunar months), Jews, Armenians, Copts, the people of Harran, and the Sabians. He also displays close knowledge of the feasts of the Church of th‌e East. Towards the end of the work, Bar Bahlul includes a section on dream interpretation that summarizes a dream manual written by the Muslim author Ibn Qutaybah (d. 889).

== Translations and editions ==
Bar Bahlul’s works were edited numerous times and translated into several languages. His Lexicon was abridged in 724 by the Maphryono Simon of Manʿim. An Armenian-Syriac copy with a few Arabic terms is preserved at the Boston Museum (MS 3980). It was copied by Bishop Ephraim Wanki of Karkar and completed in 1659, and very likely composed by a native Syrian writer into Syriac.

== See also ==
- Moses of Mardin
- Ignatius bar Wahib
- Diocese of Harran
- Syriac literature
- Neo-Aramaic languages

== Sources ==
- Rompay, Lucas Van (2011). Brock, Sebastian P.; Butts, Aaron Michael; Kiraz, George A.; Rompay, Lucas Van (eds.). Gorgias Encyclopedic Dictionary of the Syriac Heritage. Gorgias Press, LLC. ISBN 9781593337148.
- Barsoum, Ignatius Aphram (2003). The Scattered Pearls: A History of Syriac Literature and Sciences. Translated by Moosa, Matti (Second rev. ed.). Piscataway (N. J.): Gorgias Press, LLC. ISBN 1-931956-04-9.
