= Beth Mardutho =

Educational organization in Piscataway, United States

- Beth Mardutho: The Syriac Institute; Beth Mardutho Syriac Institute
- Formation: 1992
- Founder: George Kiraz
- Founded at: Piscataway, New Jersey, United States
- Purpose: Education, research, archiving
- Location: Piscataway, New Jersey, United States
- Official language: English; Syriac
- Key people: George Kiraz
- Website: bethmardutho.org

Beth Mardutho (full name: Beth Mardutho: The Syriac Institute) is an American educational institute specializing in Syriac studies. Founded by George Kiraz, the institute is based in Piscataway, New Jersey, U.S.

== History ==
The institute was originally informally founded by George A. Kiraz as the Syriac Computing Institute (SyrCOM) in 1992. SyrCOM was officially registered in 1996. In 2009, it was renamed as Beth Mardutho when Kiraz expanded the institute's activities beyond computational linguistics to include different aspects of Syriac studies.

Since 2014, the institute has been offering Syriac language summer courses.

== Projects ==
Beth Mardutho's projects include:

- Digital Syriac Corpus
- Qoruyo (Syriac OCR and HTR project)
- e-GEDSH (online version of the Gorgias Encyclopedic Dictionary of the Syriac Heritage)

Beth Mardutho has collaborated with Princeton Theological Seminary (PTS) since 2011 to archive texts related to Syriac Christianity. It has worked with the Internet Archive to digitize various Syriac-related texts.

eBethArké, hosted by Rutgers University, is a Syriac digital library started by Beth Mardutho in 2000.

== See also ==
- Gorgias Press
