= Syriaca.org =

- Website type: Reference
- Available in: English
- Owners: Vanderbilt University; Princeton University

Syriaca.org: The Syriac Reference Portal is a digital portal for the academic study of the Syriac language and culture. The portal is maintained by Princeton and Vanderbilt Universities, and aims to link together information relating to Syriac studies using Uniform Resource Identifiers.

== Projects ==
Syriaca.org unifies a number of projects.

=== The Syriac Biographical Dictionary ===
The Syriac Biographical Dictionary (SBD) is a digital name and authority record listing biographical information for Syriac authors. It comprises two "volumes", 1. Qadishe: A Digital Catalogue of Saints in the Syriac Tradition, and 2. A Guide to Syriac Authors. As of 2019, its general editor is David A. Michelson.
