= Antioch Bible =

Syriac Peshitta English translation

- Other names: Ṣurath Kthobh
- Language: English and Syriac
- NT published: 2020
- Apocrypha: 1–4 Maccabees, Susanna, Judith, etc.
- Authorship: George Kiraz et al.
- Textual basis: Peshiṭta
- Translation type: Dynamic equivalence (idiomatic)
- Reading level: High school
- Publisher: Gorgias Press
- Religious affiliation: Syriac Christian
- Webpage: www.gorgiaspress.com/antiochbible
- Genesis 1:1–3 In the beginning God created the heavens and the earth. The earth was a formless void and darkness was over the surface of the abyss and the wind of God hovered over the surface of the waters. God said, "Let there be light"; and there was light. John 3:16 For God loved the world in this way: that he would give his one and only Son, so that everyone who believes in him will not perish but have eternal life.

The Antioch Bible (Syriac: Ṣurath Kthobh) is a bilingual Syriac–English edition of the Bible published by Gorgias Press. It was derived, both the Old and New Testaments, from the Syriac Peshitta, used by the Assyrian Church of the East and Syriac Orthodox Church, and other Syriac Christian traditions.

== History ==
Gorgias Press began publication of the Antioch Bible in 2012. In 2020, 35 volumes have been published. A single volume edition of the New Testament was released in 2020. The English translation of the Antioch Bible was reviewed by Sebastian Brock and other scholars, while much of the translation was undertaken by George A. Kiraz and various others.

A multi-volume concordance also accompanies the main text of the Antioch Bible.

== Contributors ==
Contributors of the Antioch Bible include:

- Dayroyo Joseph Bali
- A.J. Berkovitz
- Aaron M. Butts
- Jeff W. Childers
- Edward M. Cook
- Philip Michael Forness
- Anthony Gelston
- Binyamin Goldstein
- Robert P. Gordon
- Gillian Greenberg
- John Healey
- Scott Johnson
- Andreas Juckel
- Daniel King
- George A. Kiraz
- Robert Kitchen
- Jonathan A. Loopstra
- Jerome A. Lund
- Carmel McCarthy
- Mark R. Meyer
- James D. Moore
- Craig E. Morrison
- Robert Owens
- James Prather
- Morgan Reed
- Jack Tannous
- Richard A. Taylor
- Eric Tully
- Donald M. Walter
- James Walters

== See also ==
- Peshitta
