= Ľudmila Podjavorinská =

Czechoslovak poet, writer and children books writer

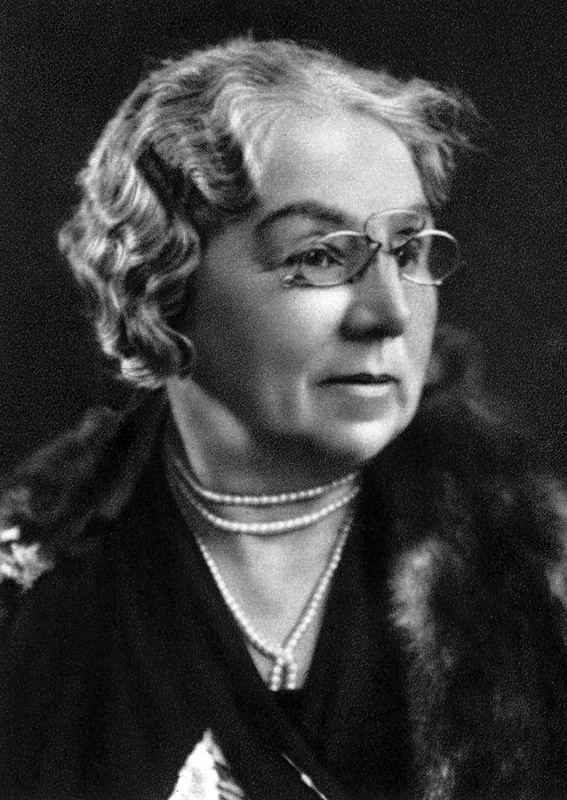
- Born: Ľudmila Riznerová; 26 April 1872; Bzince pod Javorinou, Nyitra County, Kingdom of Hungary, Austria-Hungary
- Died: 2 March 1951 (aged 78); Nové Mesto nad Váhom, Czechoslovakia
- Writing career
- Genres: poetry, novel, children's literature

Ľudmila Podjavorinská was a pen name used by Ľudmila Riznerová (26 April 1872 – 2 March 1951), a Slovak writer considered to be the first important woman poet for her country but best known for her children's books. She wrote under a number of different pen names, including Božena, Damascena, Ľ. Šeršelínová, Ľ. Špirifangulínová, Ľudka and Ľudmila.

The daughter of Karol Rizner, a teacher, she was born in the village of Bzince pod Javorinou. Her uncle Ľudovít Rizner encouraged her to submit her first writing to newspapers for publication. Podjavorinská had three contemporary women writers as mentors: Terézia Vansová, Elena Maróthy-Šoltésová and Božena Slančíková. She contributed to various Slovak periodicals and translated Russian poetry into Slovak.

She stayed in her home town until 1910, when she moved to Nové Mesto nad Váhom. For a short time around 1918, she was an official for the district Red Cross. Podjavorinská was a member of Živena, the first women's organization in Slovakia. In 1947, she was named a National Artist for Czechoslovakia.

Podjavorinská died in Nové Mesto nad Váhom at the age of 78.

A minor planet was named Podjavorinská in her honour.

== Selected works ==
Sources:

- Z vesny života ("From life's spring"), poetry (1895)
- V otroctve ("In slavery"), novel (1905)
- Žena ("Woman"), novel (1909)
- Baránok boží ("Lamb of God"), short story about a severely abused child's tragic death (1932)
- Kytka veršov pre slovenské dietky ("A bouquet of poems for Slovak children"), children's poetry (1920)
- Balady ("Ballads"), poetry (1930)
- Veršíky pre maličkých ("Verses for little ones"), children's poetry (1930)
- Medový hrniec ("Pot of honey"), children's poetry (1930)
- Klásky ("Ears of grain"), children's poetry (1947)
