= Gorgias Press =

American publishing company

- Status: Active
- Founded: 2001
- Founders: Christine Kiraz and George Kiraz
- Country of origin: United States
- Headquarters location: Piscataway, New Jersey
- Distribution: Worldwide
- Publication types: Books, academic journals
- Nonfiction topics: History, Religious studies, Linguistics, Syriac studies, Ancient Near East, Early Christianity, Arabic studies, Islamic studies, Jewish studies
- Official website: www.gorgiaspress.com

Gorgias Press is a US-based independent academic publisher specializing in the history and religion of the Middle East and the larger pre-modern world.

The main scope covers Syriac Christianity and Syriac literature, but the press has grown to cover additional topics including the ancient Near East, biblical studies, Arabic and Islamic studies, and more.

== History ==
Founded in 2001 by Christine and George Kiraz, the press is based in Piscataway, New Jersey.

The press publishes titles in history, religious studies, and linguistics, with a special focus on the Ancient Near East, Syriac, Arabic, Early Christianity, Classical studies, Biblical studies, Jewish studies, Mandaean studies, and Islamic studies. Authors include Jamal-Dominique Hopkins, Sebastian Brock, Jorunn Jacobsen Buckley, Clinton Bennett, David C. Parker, Andrei Orlov, Iain Torrance, Philip Khuri Hitti, George Percy Badger, Ignatius Zakka I Iwas, Ignatius Afram I Barsoum, Ignatius Elias III, Aziz Suryal Atiya, and William Hatch. The press also publishes critical editions and English translations of previously untranslated or under-translated works, such as those of Hippolytus of Rome, Jacob of Sarug, and Isaac the Syrian.

Gorgias publishes more than 30 book series, including Gorgias Handbooks, Gorgias Ugaritic Studies, Gorgias Mandaean Studies, Judaism in Context, and Texts from Christian Late Antiquity. In addition to books, the press publishes several peer-reviewed academic journals, including the Journal of the Canadian Society for Syriac Studies and the American Journal of Ancient History.

In 2010, Gorgias published three volumes of peer-reviewed articles as part of Foundations for Syriac Lexicography in association with the International Syriac Language Project. Beginning in 2012, the press published the first of an ongoing 35 volume English translation of the Antioch Bible, an Aramaic text of the Syriac Peshitta.

In 2018, German academic publisher Walter de Gruyter and Gorgias entered into an e-book distribution partnership.

In 2025, the press launched the Gorgias Press Books eReader app in partnership with Glassboxx, to enable retail customers to download eBook editions of the Gorgias catalog.

2026 is the 25th anniversary of Gorgias Press.

== See also ==
- Beth Mardutho
