= Nasser Sobbi =

Iranian-American Mandaean scribe

- Born: March 13, 1924; Khorramshahr, Iran
- Died: December 22, 2018 (aged 94); Flushing, Queens, New York, United States
- Other name: Adam bar Mahnuš
- Occupation: Scribe
- Notable work: Ginza Rabba (1989 handwritten copy)
- Spouse: Shukrieh Sobbi
- Children: 5

Nasser Sobbi (Persian: ناصر صبي; born March 13, 1924, Khorramshahr; died December 22, 2018, Flushing, Queens) was an Iranian-American Mandaean scribe, manuscript collector, and goldsmith who was known as one of the last remaining fully fluent native speakers of Neo-Mandaic in the United States. He was a yalufa (learned Mandaean layman), though not a formally ordained Mandaean priest.

== Biography ==
=== Early life ===
Nasser Sobbi was born in Muḥammara (now known as Khorramshahr), Iran on March 13, 1924. His Mandaean baptismal name is Adam bar Mahnuš (Classical Mandaic: ࡀࡃࡀࡌ ࡁࡓ ࡌࡀࡄࡍࡅࡔ, romanized: Adam br Mahnuš, lit. 'Adam, son of Mahnuš'). During his childhood and adolescence, he lived in both Khorramshahr and Abadan. In 1932, he was present at a wedding ceremony in Khorramshahr that was attended by E. S. Drower and Abdullah Khaffagi, and led by Ganzibra Masboob, the last Mandaean priest of Khorramshahr (and also the grandfather of Sheikh Fawzi Masboob of Detroit, United States). Starting from 1938, he was an apprentice at his uncle Abdolkarim Moradi's jewellery shop in Abadan. During World War II, Sobbi went to Basra and Baghdad, Iraq to look for work, and returned to Iran in 1945. From 1952 to 1970, Sobbi and his family lived in Kuwait. They immigrated to New York, United States in 1970.

=== Mandaean manuscripts ===
On July 16, 1989, Sobbi finished copying a handwritten copy of the Ginza Rabba, the only one of its kind in North America. Sobbi also owned the largest private collection of Mandaean manuscripts in North America, including a handwritten manuscript of the Mandaean Book of John that was copied by Sheikh Mhatam bar Yahya Bihram on April 9, 1910. Sobbi also owned a copy of the Haran Gawaita from 1930 that was copied by Mulla Sa’ad, the grandfather of Jabbar Choheili.

Sobbi became acquainted with Norwegian-American scholar Jorunn Jacobsen Buckley in 1994. For decades, he assisted Buckley with her research on Mandaean manuscript colophons.

=== Mandaic language ===
Sobbi was a fluent native speaker, reader, and writer of Mandaic. He spoke Neo-Mandaic regularly with his wife Shukrieh, his brother Dakhil A. Shooshtary, and his uncle Abdolkarim Moradi, a resident of Syosset, New York. Throughout the 2000s, Sobbi worked as Charles G. Häberl's Neo-Mandaic language informant for Häberl's 2006 Harvard doctoral dissertation The Neo-Mandaic Dialect of Khorramshahr, which was later published as a monograph by Harrassowitz Verlag in 2009.

Sobbi died on December 22, 2018, in Flushing at the age of 94.

== Family ==
Nasser Sobbi was the father of one son, Isa, and four daughters, Freshteh, Juliette, Labiba, and Nabila. Labiba's husband grew up in a Neo-Mandaic-speaking household and could understand the language, but was not a fluent speaker himself.

Sobbi married Shukrieh Sobbi in 1950. The couple celebrated their 50th wedding anniversary in 2000.

His brother, Dakhil A. Shooshtary (d. January 26, 2022), was also a fluent speaker of Neo-Mandaic and compiled various Mandaic dictionaries, including an English-Mandaic dictionary, Arabic-Mandaic dictionary, and Farsi-Mandaic dictionary.

== See also ==
- Salem Choheili
- Sinan Abdullah
- List of Mandaic manuscripts
