= Syriac studies =

Study of the Syriac language and Syriac Christianity

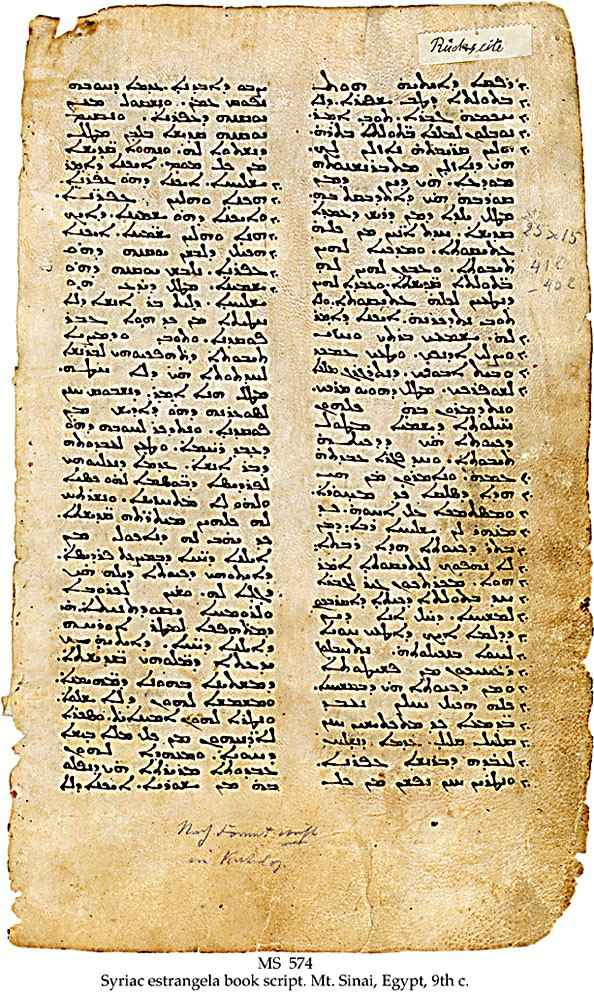
9th century Syriac Estrangela manuscript of John Chrysostom's Homily on the Gospel of John

Syriac studies is the study of the Syriac language and Syriac Christianity. A specialist in Syriac studies is known as a Syriacist. Specifically, British, French, and German scholars of the 18th and 19th centuries who were involved in the study of Syriac/Aramaic language and literature were commonly known by this designation, at a time when the Syriac language was little understood outside Assyrian and Maronite Christian communities, as well as larger communities adhering to Syriac Christianity. In Germany the field of study is distinguished between Aramaistik (Aramaic studies) and Neuaramaistik (Neo-Aramaic (Syriac) studies).

At universities, Syriac studies are mostly incorporated into a more 'general' field of studies, such as Eastern Christianity at the School of Oriental and African Studies, University of London, Aramaic studies at the University of Oxford and University of Leiden, Eastern Christianity at Duke University, or Semitic studies at the Freie Universität Berlin. Most students learn the Syriac language within a biblical studies program. Conferences for Syriac studies include the Symposium Syriacum, the Section "Bible and Syriac Studies in Context" at the International Meetings of the Society of Biblical Literature, and the Section "Syriac Literature and Interpretations of Sacred Texts" at the Annual Meetings of the Society of Biblical Literature.

Syriac academic journals include the annual Oriens Christianus (Wiesbaden) and Syriac Studies Today. Syriaca.org is a centralized academic portal for Syriac studies.

The field of Syriac studies has been shaped by a series of fifteenth to nineteenth-century Orientalist biases that prioritized the purity of ancient origins over the complexity of later medieval authorship. Early scholars, often operating within imperial or missionary frameworks, tended to view the Syriac tradition not as an autonomous intellectual force, but as a secondary bridge between the classical Greek past and the Islamic future. This perspective reduced the millennia-long literary culture to a stagnant footnote, stripping Syriac authors of their agency and framing their most sophisticated works as mere acts of preservation rather than creative adaptation.

== Contemporary Syriacists and Orientalists ==
The history of the Syriac studies and the Syriac heritage has been documented and analyzed by a diverse range of historians across centuries. Their work have provided invaluable insights into their language, heritage, religion, and interactions with dominant empires and surrounding cultures. Below is a list of a few of them

=== 15th to 18th Centuries ===
1. Teseo Ambrogio degli Albonesi (1469–1540) was an early Italian humanist who introduced Syriac and other Oriental languages to European scholarship, notably through his Introductio in Chaldaicam linguam, Syriacam, atque Armenicam, et decem alias linguas (1539).
2. Guillaume Postel (1510–1581), a French scholar also made significant contributions, recognizing the relationship between various Semitic languages and acquiring numerous Eastern manuscripts.
3. Sebastian Münster (1488–1552), a German Hebraist who extended his work to Aramaic (then often termed "Chaldaic"), publishing a Grammatica Chaldaica (1527) and a Dictionarium Chaldaicum (1527).
4. Edmund Castell (1606–1685), an English scholar, produced the Lexicon Heptaglotton (1669), a seven-language dictionary including comprehensive sections on Syriac and Aramaic ("Chaldaicum"), which remained a standard reference for centuries.
5. The Assemani Family (primarily 18th century, but with lasting influence): Though their primary work predates the 19th century, Giuseppe Simone Assemani (1687-1768) and his nephew Stefano Evodio Assemani (1707-1782) laid indispensable groundwork. Their Bibliotheca Orientalis Clementino Vaticana was a cornerstone for Syriac scholarship for generations, heavily influencing 19th-century research.

=== 19th Century ===
1. Robert Payne Smith (1818–1895): He compiled the monumental Thesaurus Syriacus (1868–1901), a comprehensive dictionary of the Syriac language.
2. Jessie Payne Smith (Margoliouth) (1856–1933): Daughter of Robert Payne made this vast work more accessible by producing A Compendious Syriac Dictionary in 1903.
3. Ernest Renan (1823–1892): The French scholar, in his broad work on the history of religions and Semitic languages, also contributed to the understanding of Aramean and early Syriac history.
4. William Wright (1830–1889): His cataloging of Syriac manuscripts in the British Museum, Catalogue of Syriac Manuscripts in The British Museum acquired since the year 1838 (1870) and editions of historical texts made primary sources accessible to a wider scholarly audience.
5. William Cureton (1808-1864): An English Orientalist, Cureton is renowned for his discovery and publication of important Syriac manuscripts, including the Curetonian Gospels, an early recension of the Syriac Gospels.
6. John Gwynn (1827-1917): An Irish Syriacist whose work bridged the late 19th and early 20th centuries. He is noted for his editions of Syriac New Testament texts, including a critical edition of the Apocalypse.

=== 20th Century and later years ===
This list includes the scholars that their major works published in the 20th century and later

1. E. R. Hayes: A French scholar who contributed to the field of Syriac studies, and he is known for his work on the Syriac versions of early Christian texts. His contributions aided in understanding the transmission and development of biblical and theological literature in Syriac. He published his book, Ecole d'Édesse, about the School of Edessa in 1930
2. E. W. Brooks (1884–1957): A scholar of Byzantine and Syriac studies and he was primarily known for his critical editions and translations of Greek and Syriac historical texts. His meticulous work on these primary sources significantly advanced the study of early Christian and Byzantine history.
3. François Nau (1864–1931): A French Orientalist, specializing in Syriac and Armenian studies. He made significant contributions to the publication and translation of early Christian texts from these traditions and his work provided valuable insights into the history of Christian thought and communities in the Near East.
4. C. Anton Baumstark (1872–1948): A German Catholic priest and prominent scholar of comparative liturgy and Oriental Christianity. He developed the "Baumstark's Law," which describes the tendency for liturgical developments to spread from older to newer centers and his extensive research documented the diverse liturgical traditions of the Eastern Christian churches.
5. Theodor Nöldeke (1836–1930): A foundational figure in Semitic philology, Nöldeke's work on Syriac grammar and literature inherently touched upon historical contexts, and he wrote influential studies on the ancient Semitic world, including Arameans.
6. Eduard Sachau (1845-1930): A German Orientalist, Sachau made significant contributions through his expeditions to the Middle East and his meticulous work on Syriac manuscripts. His Catalogue of Syriac Manuscripts in the Royal Library of Berlin (1899) remains a vital resource.
7. James Rendel Harris (1852-1941): An English biblical scholar and manuscript curator. He played a key role in uncovering Syriac Scriptures and early documents. Harris notably discovered the Syriac text of the Apology of Aristides. He was a prolific writer on biblical and patristic history.
8. Jean-Baptiste Chabot (1860–1948): A French Syriac scholar who edited and translated numerous important Syriac historical texts, including the Chronicle of Michael the Syrian and the Chronicle of Edessa.
9. Rubens Duval (1839-1911): A French Orientalist, Duval published important works on Syriac literature and grammar, including his Traité de grammaire syriaque (1881) and editions of various Syriac texts, contributing to the linguistic tools available to scholars.
10. Paul Peeters (1870-1950): A Belgian Bollandist, Peeters made significant contributions to Syriac hagiography, notably through his work on the Bibliotheca Hagiographica Orientalis, an essential catalog of saints' lives in Eastern Christian traditions.
11. Carl Brockelmann (1868-1956): While his major works, particularly the Lexicon Syriacum (1928) and Syrische Grammatik (1924), were published in the 20th century, Brockelmann's formative period and early contributions began in the late 19th century. His comprehensive lexicographical and grammatical work has been indispensable for generations of Syriacists.
12. Arthur Vööbus (1909–1988): An Estonian-American scholar, Vööbus made monumental contributions to the study of Syriac ecclesiastical history, monasticism, and literature, particularly through his discovery and publication of manuscripts.
13. Jean-Maurice Fiey (1914–1995): A Dominican scholar who made monumental contributions to the historical geography and ecclesiastical history of Syriac Christianity, particularly the Church of the East, with works like Assyrie Chrétienne.
14. Patriarch Ignatius Aphrem I Barsoum (1887–1957): A Syriac Orthodox Patriarch and scholar, his The Scattered Pearls: A History of Syriac Literature and Sciences provides an invaluable insider's historical account of Syriac intellectual and cultural heritage.
15. Klaus Beyer (1929-2014): A German Semitist, Beyer was renowned for his monumental work Die aramäischen Texte vom Toten Meer (1984, with a supplement in 1994, and an Ergänzungsband in 2004), which provided an exhaustive grammar and lexicon of the Aramaic Dead Sea Scrolls. He also published extensively on other Aramaic dialects.
16. Sebastian P. Brock (born 1938): A leading contemporary Syriac scholar, Brock has profoundly influenced the field with his extensive writings on all aspects of Syriac history, literature, and theology, emphasizing the richness and diversity of Syriac Christianity.
17. David G.K. Taylor: A prominent British Syriacist, Taylor has contributed significantly to the understanding of Syriac history, particularly in relation to biblical versions and the broader cultural context of Syriac Christianity.
18. Andrew Palmer: Known for his work on Syriac chronicles and the history of the Syriac Orthodox Church, particularly through his annotated translation of the Chronicle of Zuqnin and Monk and Mason on the Tigris Frontier
19. Daniel King: A scholar focusing on Syriac philosophy and the transmission of Greek thought into Syriac. He is also known for his editorial work, including The Syriac World, a comprehensive overview of the field.
20. Amir Harrak: Known for his work on Syriac chronicles and inscriptions, including the Chronicle of Zuqnin.
21. Françoise Briquel-Chatonnet: A French scholar specializing in Semitic studies, including the history and epigraphy of Aramean and Syriac cultures.
22. Muriel Debié: A historian focusing on Syriac historiography and the cultural interactions between Syriac Christians and the surrounding societies in late antiquity and the early Islamic period.
23. Susan Ashbrook Harvey: A scholar of late antique and Byzantine Christianity, with a particular focus on Syriac studies. Her scholarly work has made significant contributions to understanding the social aspects of early Christianity, especially issues concerning women and gender in the Syriac Orient, asceticism, and the cult of saints.
24. Fr. Dr. Iskandar Bcheiry: Is a scholar and church historian with many published books and academic papers. His scholarly work is focused on the Syriac Orthodox Church history, Syriac Orthodox Church theology, and studying and editing Syriac manuscripts from Late Antiquities and Medieval periods.
25. Marianna Mazzola: A Syriac scholar who work on the cultural and social history of the Medieval Middle East, 7th -13th centuries with a focus on Syriac Christianity and its relation with Byzantium and Islam, Syriac historiography and codicology, including excerpt collections in transcultural comparison. Published the book: From High Priest to Patriarch: History and Authority in the Ecclesiastical History of Bar 'Ebroyo

== See also ==
- Aramaic studies
- Assyriology
- Christian studies
- Corpus Scriptorum Christianorum Orientalium
- Department of Syriac Studies
- Mandaean studies
- Terms for Syriac Christians
- Peshitta
- Syriac chant
- Syriac literature
- Syriac sacral music
- Beth Mardutho
- Gorgias Press
- Syriaca.org
