= Eric Segelberg =

Swedish theologian (1920–2001)

- Born: December 20, 1920 (age 105); Nyköping, Sweden
- Died: October 17, 2001 (aged 80); Uppsala, Sweden
- Occupations: Theologian, professor

Academic background
- Education: Uppsala University and Oxford University
- Thesis: Maṣbūtā: Studies in the Ritual of the Mandæan Baptism (1958)

Academic work
- Discipline: History of religion
- Institutions: Dalhousie University
- Main interests: Early Christianity, Gnosticism, Mandaeism

Eric Segelberg (20 December 1920 – 17 October 2001) was a Swedish theologian, professor, and a priest of the Lutheran Church of Sweden.

== Early life and education ==
Segelberg was born in Nyköping, Sweden. He was ordained to the priesthood in 1944, and he continued to study theology and classics at both Uppsala University and Oxford University, receiving a doctorate in history of religion. His dissertation in 1958 was titled Maṣbūtā: Studies in the Ritual of the Mandæan Baptism.

== Career ==
He became professor of classics at Dalhousie University, Canada, in 1968. As professor emeritus, he returned to Sweden. Widely known in many fields, he specialized in study of patristics, Mandaean studies, and Gnosticism. His main specialization was in liturgics. His quite outstanding liturgical knowledge characterized his studies in the history of religion. Some of his notable writings include "The Benedictio Olei in the Apostolic Tradition of Hippolytus", (Oriens Christianus 48, 1964), and "The Ordination of the Mandæan tarmida and its Relation to Jewish and Early Christian Ordination Rites", (Studia Patristica 10, 1970).

Segelberg was member of the Societas Sanctae Birgittae. In Sweden, he was a well-known member of the Swedish high-church movement Arbetsgemenskapen Kyrklig Förnyelse ("The Church Union in Sweden"). He established a trust in 1984 to enhance Christian theological research, education and youth work. In Sweden, he founded Segelbergska stiftelsen för liturgivetenskaplig forskning (Segelberg Foundation for Liturgical Research), located in Uppsala, Sweden.

In 1990, a Festschrift to him was published, collecting a number of his own writings: Gnostica – mandaica – liturgica. Opera eius ipsius selecta & collecta septuagenario Erico Segelberg oblata curantibus Jan Bergman, Jan Hjärpe, Per Ström una cum Bibliographia Segelbergiana ab Oloph Bexell redacta (Acta Universitatis Upsaliensis. Historia Religionum 11.).

He died in Uppsala in 2001.
