= George Kiraz =

American Syriacist

George Anton Kiraz
- Born: 1965 (age 60–61); Bethlehem, West Bank
- Occupation: Scholar
- Known for: Gorgias Press; Beth Mardutho

George Anton Kiraz (Syriac: ܓܘܪܓܝ ܒܪ ܐܢܛܘܢ ܕܒܝܬ ܟܝܪܐܙ; born 1965) is a Syriac scholar, best known for his contribution to modern Syriac studies.

== Early life ==
George Kiraz was born in Bethlehem to a Syriac Orthodox merchant family which traces its roots back to Elazığ in Anatolia. He learned Syriac at the Monastery of Saint Mark, Jerusalem. In 1983 he emigrated with his family to the United States where they settled in Los Angeles.

== Education ==
Kiraz holds numerous degrees, including a B.Sc. degree in Engineering from California State University, Northridge in 1990, a master's degree in Syriac Studies from the University of Oxford in 1991, a master's degree in computer speech and language processing, and a Ph.D. degree in computational linguistics from the University of Cambridge in 1992 and 1996 respectively.

== Career ==
In 1986, Kiraz designed the first computer fonts for Syriac and established a one-person company in Los Angeles named Alaph Beth Computer Systems for their distribution. He developed the proposal for encoding Syriac in Unicode (with Paul Nelson and Sargon Hasso) and designed the Unicode compliant Meltho fonts, which enable Syriac computing on modern computers. His fonts are by far the most popular Syriac computer fonts used in the 20th and 21st centuries.

He has been involved in Syriac-related projects, such as the co-founding of Gorgias Press, a publishing house dedicated to Syriac studies and other subjects in the humanities, and directing the Beth Mardutho Syriac Institute, which seeks to promote Syriac heritage and language.

Between 1996 and 2000, he worked at Bell Labs as a member of technical staff in the Language Modeling Group. Between 2000 and 2001, he was instrumental in opening an office for Nuance Communications on Wall Street, New York. His research interests include finite-state technology, computational morphology and phonology, and Syriac studies.

== Ordinations ==
Kiraz is a deacon in the Syriac Orthodox Church. He was consecrated and anointed a reader (Syriac Qoruyo) in Bethlehem on February 6, 1977, by the laying on of the hands of Mor Dioscoros Luqa Sha'ya, then Metropolitan of Jerusalem. He was ordained a sub-deacon by the late Mor Julius Yeshu Çiçek at St. Mark's Monastery on January 9, 1983. He was ordained a full deacon (Syriac: ewangeloyo) in Teaneck, New Jersey, by Mor Cyril Aphrem Karim (now Moran Mor Ignatius Aphrem II) on October 14, 2012.

He has served in the following churches:

- St. Mary, Bethlehem (ca. 1973–1983)
- St. Mark's Monastery, Jerusalem, and the Holy Sites (ca. 1979–1983)
- St. Ephrem, Los Angeles (1983–1990, 1996)
- St. Jacob Burd‛ono, London (1991–1996, sporadically)
- St. Mark's Cathedral, formerly Teaneck, New Jersey, currently Paramus, New Jersey (1996–)
- St. John bar Aphtonia, Cranbury, New Jersey (2003–2022)

== Personal life ==
He is married to Christine Kiraz. They live with their three children in Piscataway, New Jersey.

== Bibliography ==
Kiraz has published a number of books about the Syriac language, and co-authored many others:

- The Syriac primer: reading, writing, vocabulary & grammar: with exercises and cassette activities, 1988.
- Computer-Generated Concordance to the Syriac New Testament, six volumes, 1993.
- Lexical tools to the Syriac New Testament, 1994.
- Anton Kiraz's archive on the Dead Sea scrolls, 2005.
- The new Syriac primer: an introduction to the Syriac language (with CD), 2007.
- Comparative Edition of the Syriac Gospels: Aligning the Old Syriac (Sinaiticus, Curetonianus), Peshitta and Harklean Versions, 2003.
- The acts of Saint George and the story of his father: from the Syriac and Garshuni versions, 2009.
- Introduction to Syriac Spirantization, Rukkâkâ and Quššâyâ (Losser, The Netherlands: Bar Hebraeus Verlag, 1995)
- Computational Nonlinear Morphology, with Emphasis on Semitic Languages (Cambridge, U.K.: Cambridge University Press, 2002)
- Syriac Alphabet for Children: Serto Edition (Piscataway, N.J.: Gorgias Press, 2004)
- (With Sebastian P. Brock) Ephrem the Syrian: Select Poems: Vocalized Syriac text with English translation, introduction and notes (Utah: Brigham Young University Press, 2006)
- Tūrāṣ Mamllā: A Grammar of the Syriac Language, Volume I: Syriac Orthography (Piscataway, N.J.: Gorgias Press, 2012)
- (With Sebastian P. Brock, Aaron Butts, and Lucas Van Rompay) The Gorgias Encyclopedic Dictionary of the Syriac Heritage (Piscataway, N.J.: Gorgias Press, 2011)

He is directing the Antioch Bible project. As of 2014, he has published over 40 papers in the fields of computational linguistics and Syriac studies.
