= Semitic studies =

Study of the Semitic peoples

Semitic studies, also called Semitistics, Semitics or Semitology, is the academic discipline dedicated to the study of Semitic languages and literature and history of Semitic-speaking peoples. Specialists in Semitic studies may be known as Semitists, less commonly as Semitic scholars, Semiticists or Semitologists.

Semitic studies may include Assyriology, Aramaic, Arabic, Hebraic, and Ethiopian studies, as well as comparative studies of Semitic languages aiming at the reconstruction of the Proto-Semitic language.

== See also ==
- Asian studies
- African studies
- Middle Eastern studies
- Semitic people

== Sources ==
- Gotthelf Bergsträsser: Einführung in die semitischen Sprachen: Sprachproben und grammatische Skizzen, Nachdruck, Darmstadt 1993.
- Carl Brockelmann: Grundriss der vergleichenden Grammatik der semitischen Sprachen, Bd. 1-2, 1908/1913.
- David Cohen: Dictionnaire des racines sémitiques ou attestées dans les langues sémitiques.
- Giovanni Garbini, Olivier Durand: Introduzione alle lingue semitiche (1994), ISBN 88-394-0506-2 (review: Franz Rosenhal; The Journal of the American Oriental Society, Vol. 116, 1996).
- Robert Hetzron (ed.): The Semitic Languages, London 1997.
- Burkhart Kienast: Historische semitische Sprachwissenschaft, Wiesbaden 2001.
