= Syriac Gospels, British Library, Add. 14462 =

British Library, Add MS 14462, designated by number 92 on the list of Wright, is a Syriac manuscript of the New Testament, according to the Peshitta version, on parchment. Palaeographically it has been assigned to the 6th century.

== Description ==
It contains the text of the first two Gospels according to the Peshitta version, on 106 leaves (8 7/8 by 5 1/8 in, 230 by 130 mm), with some lacunae. The number of quires is now 14. The writing is in two columns per page, 21-27 lines per page. The writing is in fine and regular Estrangela. The manuscript was written by two hands (1-68 recto and 68 verso-106). Some lessons are rubricated, but only in the Gospel of Mark.

The text is divided according to the Ammonian Sections, with references to the Eusebian Canons. There is a harmony of the four Gospels at the food of each page.

There is a note on folio 68 recto "I, Nonnus have written".

The manuscript was brought from the covenant of St. Mary Deipara. It was described by William Aldis Wright.

The manuscript is housed at the British Library (Add MS 14462) in London.

== See also ==
- List of the Syriac New Testament manuscripts
- Syriac versions of the Bible
- British Library, Add MS 14454
- British Library, Add MS 14457
