= British Library, Add MS 17122 =

British Library, Add MS 17122, designated by number 137 on the list of Wright, is a Syriac manuscript of the New Testament, according to Peshitta version, on parchment. Palaeographically it has been assigned to the 6th century. The manuscript is lacunose.

== Description ==
It contains the text of the 14 Pauline epistles according to Peshitta version, on 129 leaves (8¾ by 5½ inches), some of which were torn. The original number of quires was 15 in number, but two of them are missing. The writing is in one column per page, 23-27 lines per page, in fine and regular estrangela.

On folio 1 recto it has the Lord's Prayer in ancient Arabic. There is Arabic note on folio 11 verso with name Gabriel.

The manuscript was brought from the covenant of St. Mary Deipara (in the Nitrian Desert) in 1842 and brought to London along with the other 550 manuscripts. The manuscript was described by William Aldis Wright.

Currently the manuscript is housed at the British Library (Add MS 17122) in London.

== See also ==
- List of the Syriac New Testament manuscripts
- Syriac versions of the Bible
- Biblical manuscript
- British Library, Add MS 17124
- British Library, Add MS 17212
