= Syriac New Testament, British Library, Add. 14448 =

British Library, Add MS 14448, designated by number 64 on the list of Wright, is a Syriac manuscript of the New Testament, on parchment, according to the Peshitta version. It is dated by a Colophon to the year 699 or 700. The manuscript is a lacunose. Gregory labelled it by 14^{e} (for the Gospels), 9^{a} (for the Acts and General epistles), and 8^{p} (for the Pauline epistles). The codex is in the British Library as Add MS 14448.

== Description ==
The original codex contained the text of the 22 books of Peshitta translation of the New Testament, on 209 parchment leaves (9 1/8 by 5 7/8 in, 230 by 150 mm), with some lacunae (Matthew 1:1-2:13, 3:14-5:24, 8:26-9:19, Philippians, Colossians, 1 and 2 Thessalonians, and 1 Timothy, Hebrews 7:4-9:21). The text is written in one column per page, in 26-32 lines per page. The writing is a small, elegant, Nestorian Estrangela, with numerous vowel-points and other marks, though many of these (as also a very few Greek vowels) have been added at a later period. Folio 64 is a restoration, on paper, supplied in the 13th century.

The Gospel of Matthew is divided into 22 sections, Gospel of Mark into 13 sections, Gospel of Luke – 23 sections, and Gospel of John – 20 sections. The Book of Acts, Epistle of James, First Epistle of Peter, and First Epistle of John are divided into 32 sections. Number of section in the Pauline epistles 55. Total number of sections in the whole New Testament, 165.

On the margins of some pages there are notes, in a later hand, referring chiefly to matters of pronunciation and accentuation, similar to those in the manuscript Add MS 12138.

It lacks the Pericope Adulterae (John 7:53-8:11).

== History of the manuscript ==
In the colophon on the folio 209 verso written: "This New Testament was begun on the first Ilul, and finished when ten days of Shebat were passed; in the year 1012, according to the well-known era of Greeks, which is, according to that of the Arabs, 80; under the rule of the house of Marwan, in the days of ... [the Ishma]elites". But there can be little doubt that the book was written in the reign of Abdu l-Malik ibn Marwan, for A.H. 80 = A.D. 699-700 = A. Gr. 1011-1012.

Formerly it belonged to the monastery of St. Mary Deipara in the Nitrian Desert. In 1842 along with the other 500 manuscripts it was brought to England. The manuscript was examined and described by Wright.

The manuscript is housed at the British Library (Add MS 14448) in London.

== See also ==
- List of the Syriac New Testament manuscripts
- Syriac versions of the Bible
- Biblical manuscript
- Codex Phillipps 1388
- British Library, Add MS 14479
- British Library, Add MS 14453
