= Syriac New Testament, British Library, Add. 14453 =

Syriac manuscript of the New Testament

British Library, Add MS 14453, designated by number 66 on the list of Wright, is a Syriac manuscript of the New Testament, on parchment, according to the Peshitta version. Palaeographically it has been assigned to the 5th or 6th century. The manuscript is lacunose. Gregory labelled it by 15^{e}.

== Description ==
The original codex contained the text of the 22 books of Peshitta translation of the New Testament, on 182 parchment leaves (25 by 20 cm), with only one lacuna at the beginning and end. The Gospel of Matthew begins in 6:25, the Gospel of John ends in 20:25. Written in one column per page, in 22-27 lines per page. The writing is a large, regular Estrangela. Folio 173 was repaired with paper about the 12th century. The text is divided according to the chapters similar to the κεφαλαια of the Greek manuscripts, which were inserted by two later hands; there are lectionary markings added by a later hand.

== History of the manuscript ==
Formerly it belonged to the monastery of St. Mary Deipara in the Wadi El Natrun. In 1842 it was brought to England, with the other 500 manuscripts. The manuscript was examined and described by Wright.

The manuscript is housed at the British Library (Add MS 14453) in London.

== See also ==
- List of the Syriac New Testament manuscripts
- Syriac versions of the Bible
- Biblical manuscript
- Codex Phillipps 1388
- British Library, Add MS 14448
