= Syriac Gospels, British Library, Add. 12137 =

British Library, Add MS 12137, designated by number 75 on the list of Wright, is a Syriac manuscript of the New Testament, according to Peshitta version, on parchment. Palaeographically it has been assigned to the 6th or 7th century.

== Description ==
It contains the text of the four Gospels according to Peshitta version, on 214 leaves (10¾ by 8¼ inches). The number of quires is 18. The writing is in two columns per page, 22-25 lines per page. The writing is in fine Estrangela. Vowels were added on the first 61 leaves by a later hand. The missing leaf with text of Matthew 10:10-26 was supplied by on paper.

The text is divided according to the Ammonian Sections, with references to the Eusebian Canons. The Ammonian Sections are referred to the proper Eusebian Canons. It has lectionary markings at the margin, some of them were added by a later hand.

On folio 1 verso there is a cross, with Greek inscription φως ζωη. On folio 241 recto there is another cross with inscription in barbarous Greek: "The cross, the weapon of the Christian".

There is a note on folio 213 verso: "Samuel, a stranger, known as The recluse In Gozarta, In Egypt, collected and bound this Holy book. And I collected it from Egypt. And it belongs to the convent of the Mother of God, which is in the desert of Abba Macarius".

The manuscript was brought from the covenant of St. Mary Deipara. It was described by William Aldis Wright.

The manuscript is housed at the British Library (Add MS 12137) in London.

== See also ==
- List of the Syriac New Testament manuscripts
- Syriac versions of the Bible
- British Library, Add MS 14449
- British Library, Add MS 14457
- British Library, Add MS 17124
