= Syriac Gospels, British Library, Add. 14467 =

Syriac manuscript of the New Testament

British Library, Add MS 14467, is a Syriac manuscript of the New Testament, according to the Peshitta version, on parchment. Palaeographic analysis has dated the manuscript to the 10th century.

== Description ==
The manuscript contains the fragments of Gospel of Matthew (folios 1-8) and Gospel of John (folios 9-15), according to the Peshitta version, with Arabic translation, on 15 leaves (10 by 6¾ inches). The writing is in two columns per page, 26-37 lines per page. The Syriac column is written in Nestorian character, with occasional vowel-points and signs of punctuation, the Arabic column has a few diacritical points.

Contents
Matthew 7:22-11:1; 11:22-12:10; 16:21-17:13;
John 8:59-10:18; 16:13-18:3; 19:27-20:25.

The larger sections are marked both in the Syriac and Arabic texts.

The manuscript was brought from the covenant of St. Mary Deipara, in the Nitrian Desert.

The manuscript is housed at the British Library (Add MS 14467) in London.

== See also ==
- List of the Syriac New Testament manuscripts
- Syriac versions of the Bible
- Biblical manuscript
- Codex Phillipps 1388
- British Library, Add MS 14455
- British Library, Add MS 14459
- British Library, Add MS 14466
