= List of Syriac New Testament manuscripts =

Oldest handwritten copies of the New Testament in Syriac

Syriac-language manuscripts of the New Testament have come down in several different forms and versions over the centuires. Over 350 Syriac manuscripts of the New Testament have survived into the 21st century. The majority of them represent the Peshitta version. Only a very few manuscripts represent Old Syriac versions. Some manuscripts represent a mixed or eclectic text.

== Manuscripts housed at the British Library, Additional Manuscripts ==
#	Date	Contents
BL Add. 7157	767/768	Pauline epistles †
BL Add. 7163	8th/9th	Gospels †
BL Add. 12137	6th/7th	Gospels †
BL Add. 12138		
BL Add. 12140	6th	Gospels †
BL Add. 12141	8th	Gospels †
BL Add. 12177	1189	Gospels
BL Add. 14425	463/464	Gospels †
BL Add. 14445	532	Gospels †
BL Add. 14448	13th	New Testament
BL Add. 14449	6th/7th	Gospels †
BL Add. 14450	7th	Gospels †
BL Add. 14451	10th	Gospels †
BL Add. 14452	8th	Gospels †
BL Add. 14453	6th	Gospels †
BL Add. 14454	6th/7th	Gospels †
BL Add. 14455	6th	Gospels †
BL Add. 14456	8th	Gospels †
BL Add. 14457	6th/7th	Gospels †
BL Add. 14458	6th/7th	Gospels †
BL Add. 14459 (folios 1-66)	6th	Gospels †
BL Add. 14459 (fol. 67–169)	6th	Gospel of Luke-Gospel of John †
BL Add. 14460	600	Gospels
BL Add. 14461	6th	Gospel of Matthew-Gospel of Mark †
BL Add. 14461 (fol. 108–212)	6th	Gospel of Luke-Gospel of John †
BL Add. 14462	6th	Gospel of Matthew-Gospel of Mark
BL Add. 14463	823	Gospels †
BL Add. 14464		Gospels †
BL Add. 14465	12th	Gospels †
BL Add. 14466 (fol. 11–17)	10th/11th	Gospel of Mark Gospel of Luke †
BL Add. 14467	10th	Gospel of Matthew-Gospel of John †
BL Add. 14469	936	Gospels
BL Add. 14470	5th/6th	New Testament
BL Add. 14471	615	Gospels
BL Add. 14472	6th/7th	Acts, James, 1 Peter, 1 John
BL Add. 14473 (fol. 1–139)	6th	Acts, James, 1 Peter, 1 John
BL Add. 14473 (fol. 140–148)	11th	2 Peter, 2 John, 3 John, Jude
BL Add. 14474	11th/12th	New Testament (Except Gospels and Revelation)
BL Add. 14475	6th	Pauline epistles
BL Add. 14476	5th/6th	Pauline epistles
BL Add. 14477	6th/7th	Pauline epistles
BL Add. 14478	621h/622	Pauline epistles
BL Add. 14479	534	Pauline epistles
BL Add. 14480	5th/6th	Pauline epistles †
BL Add. 14481	6th/7th	Pauline epistles †
BL Add. 14666 (fol. 1–10)	12th	Gospel of Matthew 1:1-6:20
BL Add. 14666 (fol. 47)	12th	Gospel of Matthew 1:1-11
BL Add. 14666 (fol. 48)	10th	Gospel of Matthew 1:1-16
BL Add. 14669 (fol. 26)	12th	Gospel of Matthew 1:1-13
BL Add. 14669 (fol. 27–28)	7th	Gospel of Matthew 1:12-2:6; 4:4-24
BL Add. 14669 (fol. 29–33)	6th/7th	Gospel of Matthew †
BL Add. 14669 (fol. 34–36)	6th	Gospel of Mark, Gospel of Luke †
BL Add. 14669 (fol. 38–56)	9th	Gospels †
BL MS Add. 14680	12th/13th	Acts, Cath., Pauline epistles †
BL Add. 14681	12th/13th	Acts, Cath., Pauline epistles
BL MS Add. 14706	13th	Lectionary (Evangelistarion, Apostolarion, Old Testament)
BL Add. 14738 (fol. 6–7)	13th	Acts 12:20-13:5
BL Add. 17113	6th/7th	Gospels
BL Add. 17114	6th/7th	Gospels †
BL Add. 17115	9th/10th	New Testament †
BL Add. 17116	9th/10th	Gospel of Matthew, Gospel of Mark †
BL Add. 17117	5th/6th	Gospel of Matthew, Gospel of Mark †
BL Add. 17118	8th	Gospels †
BL Add. 17120	6th	Acts, Cath., Pauline epistles †
BL Add. 17121	6th	Acts, Cath., Pauline epistles †
BL Add. 17122	6th	Pauline epistles
BL Add. 17124	1234	New Testament
BL Add. 17157	767/768	Pauline epistles
BL Add. 17224	13th	Gospel of Matthew, Gospel of Mark †
BL Add. 17224 (fol. 37–42)	13th	Gospel of Matthew 10:16-12:11; 12:44-14:3
BL Add. 17224 (fol. 43–57)	1173	Gospel of Matthew, Gospel of John †
BL Add. 17226	13th/14th	Catholic epistles †
BL Add. 17228 (fol. 38–64)	13th	James, 1 Peter, 1 John
BL Add. 17922	1222	Gospels
BL Add. 17983	1438	Gospels †
BL MS Add. 14717	13th	Lectionary (Evangelistarion, Apostolarion, Old Testament)
BL Add. 18812	6th/7th	Acts, James, 1 Peter, 1 John

== Manuscripts housed in the Bodleian Library ==
- Dawkins 27,
- Huntington MS 133 — Bodleian Library
- Huntington MS 587, Bodleian Library
- Marsh 699, Bodleian Library

== Manuscripts housed in the Vatican Library ==
- Codex Vaticanus Syriac 12
- Codex Vaticanus Syriac 19
- Codex Vaticanus Syriac 267
- Codex Vaticanus Syriac 268

== Manuscripts housed in other collections ==
- Egerton MS 704 — Old Testament, 17th century
- Codex Phillipps 1388 — the four Gospels, 5th/6th century
- Khaburis Codex — 22 books of the New Testament, 12th century
- Nestorian Evangelion — life of Jesus in the New Testament, 15th/16th century
- Rabbula Gospels — the four Gospels, 586
- Morgan MS 783
- Morgan MS 784
- Paris syr. MS 296, I^{o}
- Schøyen Ms. 2080 — 1 Corinthians-2 Corinthians
- Schøyen Ms. 2530
- Ms. Sinai syr. 3
- StL München syr. 8

== See also ==
- Syriac versions of the Bible
- Biblical manuscript
- British Library Syriac Manuscript Collection
- List of Coptic New Testament manuscripts
