= Syriac Gospels, British Library, Add. 14457 =

British Library, Add MS 14457, designated by number 70 on the list of Wright, is a Syriac manuscript of the New Testament, according to the Peshitta version, on parchment. Palaeographically it has been assigned to the 6th or 7th century.

== Description ==
It contains the text of the four Gospels according to Peshitta version, on 200 leaves 9 1/2 by 6 1/8 inches (24 by 16 cm). The number of quires is 20. The writing is in two columns per page, 25-31 lines per page. The writing is in fine Estrangela. Folios 32, 41, 199-200 were supplied by in the 12th or 13th century on paper. The lessons are rubricated.

The text is divided according to the Ammonian Sections, with references to the Eusebian Canons. There is a harmony of the four Gospels at the food of each page. It contains subscriptions at the end of the Gospel of Mark and Luke.

There is a note on folio 94 recto: "This Gospel belongs to Rabban Gabriel, a priest, from the region of Mosul, having been preserved (?) to him by Rabban Lazarus (?) from the district of Tur-Abdin".

The manuscript was brought from the covenant of St. Mary Deipara. It was described by William Aldis Wright.

The manuscript is housed at the British Library (Add MS 14457) in London.

== See also ==
- List of the Syriac New Testament manuscripts
- Syriac versions of the Bible
- British Library, Add MS 14449
- British Library, Add MS 14454
- Syriac New Testament, British Library, Add MS 12137
