= Syriac New Testament, British Library, Add. 14449 =

British Library, Add MS 14449, designated by number 69 on the list of Wright, is a Syriac manuscript of the New Testament, according to the Peshitta version, on parchment. Palaeographically it has been assigned to the 6th or 7th century.

== Description ==
It contains the text of the four Gospels according to Peshitta version, on 197 leaves (12 7/8 by 9 3/4 in, 330 by 250 mm). The leaves 31-197 were torn. The original number of quires was 22. The writing is in two columns per page, 22-25 lines per page. The writing is in fine, large Estrangela. Many Syriac vowels were added by a later hand. Some lessons are rubricated.

The text is divided according to the Ammonian Sections, with references to the Eusebian Canons. They are marked in an ordinary way, and at the food of each page are given a harmony of the four Gospels. It contains subscriptions at the end of each Gospel.

On folio 197 verso there is a note made by a modern hand.

The manuscript was brought from the covenant of St. Mary Deipara. It was described by William Aldis Wright.

The manuscript is housed at the British Library (Add MS 14449) in London.

== See also ==
- List of the Syriac New Testament manuscripts
- Syriac versions of the Bible
- Biblical manuscript
- British Library, Add MS 14455
- British Library, Add MS 17124
