= Syriac Gospels, British Library, Add. 14454 =

British Library, Add MS 14454, designated by number 87 on the list of Wright, is a Syriac manuscript of the New Testament, according to the Peshitta version, on parchment. Palaeographically it has been assigned to the 6th or 7th century.

== Description ==
It contains the text of the first three Gospels according to Peshitta version, on 131 leaves 10 1/4 by 9 1/8 inches (26 by 23 cm), with some lacunae. The number of quires is now 14. The writing is in two columns per page, 22-27 lines per page. The writing is in fine and regular Estrangela.

The text is divided according to the Ammonian Sections, with references to the Eusebian Canons. There is a harmony of the four Gospels at the foot of each page.

There are two notes on folio 1 recto.

The manuscript was brought from the covenant of St. Mary Deipara. It was described by William Aldis Wright.

The manuscript is housed at the British Library (Add MS 14454) in London.

== See also ==
- List of the Syriac New Testament manuscripts
- Syriac versions of the Bible
- British Library, Add MS 14457
- Syriac New Testament, British Library, Add MS 12137
