= Syriac Gospels, British Library, Add. 14669 =

British Library, Add MS 14669, Syriac manuscript of the New Testament, according to the Peshitta version, on parchment. Palaeographically it has been assigned to the 6th century. It contains fragments of the Gospels.

== Description ==
It contains the text of the Gospel of Mark 14:71.72; 15:3-5.8-11.15.16; 15:17-40; Gospel of Luke 1:1-8 on 3 leaves (11 1/2 in × 8 3/8 in or 290 mm × 210 mm). The writing is in two columns per page, in 21-23 lines per page. The writing is a large, elegant Estrangela.

The manuscript is housed at the British Library (Add MS 14669, fol. 34-36) in London.

== See also ==
- List of the Syriac New Testament manuscripts

Other Peshitta manuscripts

- Codex Phillipps 1388
- British Library, Add MS 14455
- British Library, Add MS 14459
- British Library, Add MS 14479

Sortable articles

- Syriac versions of the Bible
- Biblical manuscript
