= Syriac Gospels, British Library, Add. 14466 =

British Library, Add MS 14466 is a Syriac manuscript of the New Testament, according to Peshitta version, on parchment. Palaeographically it has been assigned to the 10 or 11th century.

== Description ==
It contains the fragments of the Gospel of Mark (6:18-33; 9:31-10:19) and Gospel of Luke (1:61-2:22), according to Peshitta version, on 7 vellum leaves (6 ½ by 4 ¾ inches). Written in one column per page, in 21-23 lines per page. The writing is neat and regular. The lessons are rubricated on the margin by prima manu.

The manuscript is housed at the British Library (Add MS 14466, folios 11–17) in London.

== See also ==
- List of the Syriac New Testament manuscripts
- Syriac versions of the Bible
- Biblical manuscript
- British Library, Add MS 14455
- British Library, Add MS 14459
- British Library, Add MS 14467
- Syriac New Testament (British Library, Add MS 14479)
