= Syriac Gospels, British Library, Add. 17124 =

British Library, Add MS 17124, designated by number 65 on the list of Wright, is a Syriac manuscript of the New Testament, according to Peshitta version, on parchment. Palaeographically it has been assigned to the 10th century. The manuscript is lacunose.

== Description ==
It contains the text of the four Gospels, Acts, James, 1 Epistle of Peter, 1 Epistle of John, and 14 Pauline epistles according to Peshitta version, on 173 leaves 9 1/8 by 6 1/2 inches (23 by 17 cm). The original number of quires was 22 in number, but of the first three only four leaves remain. The writing is in two columns per page, 36 lines per page. The letters are small and neat.

According to the colophon it was written in A. Gr. 1545, i.e. A.D. 1234.

On folio 68 recto there is a note, written by Gregory, Metropolitan of Jerusalem, A. Gr. 1827 (A.D. 1516), forbidding any one to take away this New Testament from the convent of S. Mary of Deipara, in the Nitrian Desert.

The manuscript was brought from the covenant of St. Mary Deipara. The manuscript was described by William Aldis Wright.

The manuscript is housed at the British Library (Add MS 17124) in London.

== See also ==
- List of the Syriac New Testament manuscripts
- Syriac versions of the Bible
- Biblical manuscript
- British Library, Add MS 14455
- British Library, Add MS 14459
