= Syriac New Testament, British Library, Add. 14470 =

British Library, Add MS 14470, Syriac manuscript of the New Testament, on parchment. Palaeographically it has been assigned to the 5th or 6th century. It is one of the oldest manuscript of Peshitta with complete text of the New Testament.

== Contents ==
- Pericope Adulterae
- Four Gospels (usual order)
- 14 Pauline epistles (usual order)
- Acts of the Apostles
- Three Catholic epistles: James, 1 Peter, and 1 John

== Description ==
The manuscript contains the complete text of 22 books of the Peshitta New Testament, on 176 leaves (23 by 14 cm) written in two columns per page, in 40-44 lines per page. Hebrews is placed after Philemon. The manuscript is written in a small and elegant Edessene hand.

The Pericope Adulterae (John 7:53-8:11), according to the Harklensian version, prefaced by additional remark, was added by a later hand in the 9th century. It was placed before Gospel of Matthew, on folio 1.

== History ==
On the first folio, below the Pericopa Adulterae, is written in an irregular Arabic hand: "We have received this book from the Syrian priest known by the name of Ibn ---, and Salib the abbat was present to take it in charge and convoy it to the covenant of the Syrians in the desert of Bu Makar (Abba Macarius)."

On folio 2 recto there is a note, of the 10th century, stating that the codex belonged to the convent of St. Mary Deipara, in the Nitrian Desert. In 1842 it was brought to England along with the other 500 manuscripts.

The manuscript is housed in the British Library (Add MS 14470) in London.

== See also ==
- List of the Syriac New Testament manuscripts

Other manuscripts

- British Library, Add MS 14455
- British Library, Add MS 14669

Sortable articles

- Syriac versions of the Bible
- Biblical manuscript
