= Robert of Gloucester =

Robert of Gloucester may refer to one of two persons prominent in medieval England:

- Robert, 1st Earl of Gloucester (c. 1090 – 1147), major figure during the Anarchy and supporter of Empress Matilda against King Stephen
- Robert of Gloucester (historian) (fl. c. 1260 – c. 1300), chronicler of early English history
