= Bible translations into Sogdian =

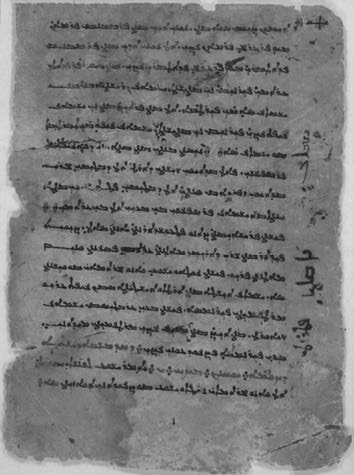

Portions of the Bible were translated into the Sogdian language in the 9th and 10th centuries. All surviving manuscripts are incomplete Christian liturgical texts (psalters and lectionaries), intended for reading on Sundays and holy days. It is unknown if a whole translation of any single book of the Bible was made, although the text known as C13 may be a fragment of a complete Gospel of Matthew. All but one text are written in Syriac script; only a few pages of the Book of Psalms written in Sogdian script are extant.

None of the surviving Sogdian texts was translated from the original Hebrew or Greek. All but one are derived from Syriac translations, mostly from the Peshitta but with some readings in C5 that could be from the Vetus Syra or the Diatessaron. One, a text of Psalm 33 under a Greek heading, was translated from the Septuagint. A number of Sogdian translations of non-Biblical works, both Christian and Manichaean, contain Biblical quotations, but these were translated along with the works in which they are found.

All surviving Sogdian Biblical texts were found in the ruins of the monastery of Bulayïq, near Turpan, which was affiliated with the Church of the East of the East Syriac Rite. The Psalm 33 fragment translated from Greek probably originally belonged to the Melkite community of Tashkent in Sogdia proper. Biblical texts in Syriac, Middle Persian and New Persian have been found at the same site. It appears that Sogdian, the local vernacular, gradually displaced Middle Persian, the vernacular of the early missionaries, and was in turn displaced by New Persian as that language spread in Central Asia. Towards the end, however, the first language of a majority of the monks of Bulayïq was Old Uyghur.

The Bible has not been translated into the sole surviving descendant of Sogdian, the Yaghnobi (Neo-Sogdian) language.

== Manuscripts ==
1. Manuscript C5. A Gospel lectionary with parts of Matthew, Luke and John, but not Mark. The Biblical texts are Sogdian but the rubrics and incipits are in Syriac.
2. Bilingual Sogdian–Syriac Gospel lectionaries wherein the translation alternates phrase by phrase.
3. Manuscript C13. Two fragments from a single page show text from the beginning of Matthew in both Sogdian and Syriac.
4. Manuscript C23. A bilingual Sogdian–Syriac lectionary of the Pauline epistles.
5. A bilingual Sogdian–Syriac psalter with Syriac headings. Only the first verse of each psalm appears.
6. A fragment containing Psalm 33 in Sogdian with a Greek incipit.
7. A few psalms in Sogdian script.

== Bibliography ==
- Barbati, Chiara (2015). "Syriac into Middle Iranian: A Translation Studies Approach to Sogdian and Pahlavi Manuscripts within the Church of the East". Open Linguistics. 1: 444–57. doi:10.1515/opli-2015-0012. hdl:11568/1038882. S2CID 49269088.
- Dickens, Mark (2009). "The Syriac Bible in Central Asia". In Erica C. D. Hunter (ed.). The Christian Heritage of Iraq. Gorgias Press. pp. 92–120.
- Hunter, Erica C. D. (2012). "Syriac, Sogdian and Old Uyghur Manuscripts from Bulayïq". The History behind the Languages: Essays of the Turfan Forum on Old Languages of the Silk Road. Shanghai: Shanghai Chinese Classics Publishing House. pp. 79–93.
- Sims-Williams, Nicholas (1989). "Bible V: Sogdian Translations of the Bible". Encyclopædia Iranica. Vol. IV, Fasc. 2. p. 207.
- Sims-Williams, Nicholas (2014). Biblical and Other Christian Sogdian Texts from the Turfan Collection. Brepols.
