= Syriac Gospels, British Library, Add. 12140 =

British Library, Add MS 12140 is a Syriac manuscript of the New Testament, on parchment. Palaeographically it had been assigned to the 6th century. It is a manuscript of Peshitta. The manuscript is a lacunose.

== Description ==
It contains the text of the four Gospels, on 196 parchment leaves (10 7/8 by 8 3/4 in or 280 by 220 mm), with some lacunae (Matthew 26:7-28; Mark 10:45-11:1). Folio 3 b was supplemented by a later scribe, but scribe wrote more than was necessary to connect with folio 4, in result Matthew 2:4-6 is repeated.

Written in two columns per page, in 23-26 lines per page. The writing is a fine bold Estrangela. Folio 2, 3, and 5 written in inelegant, angular hand from about the 11th century. Folio 133 is a paper leaf of still later date, with writing on one side only. The manuscript has many notes added by a later hand. On folio 1 b, 2 a, and 133 b it has some Arabic notes.

The manuscript is housed at the British Library (Add MS 12140) in London.

== See also ==
- List of the Syriac New Testament manuscripts
- Syriac versions of the Bible
- Biblical manuscript
- Codex Phillipps 1388
- British Library, Add MS 14479
