= John Wesley Etheridge =

English minister & scholar (1804–1866)

John Wesley Etheridge (24 February 1804 – 24 May 1866) was an English nonconformist minister and scholar. He was the first person to translate the four gospels from the Syriac Peshitta into English (1846), shortly before the full New Testament was translated by James Murdock (1856).

== Life ==
Etheridge was born near Newport, Isle of Wight. He received most of his early education from his father. Though he never attended university, Etheridge ultimately acquired a thorough knowledge of Greek, Latin, Hebrew, Syriac, French and German. In 1824 he was placed on the Wesleyan Methodist plan as a local preacher.

In 1826 his offer to enter the ministry was accepted, and after the usual probationary trial he was received into full connection at the conference of 1831. For two years after this he remained at Brighton, and in 1833 he removed to Cornwall, being stationed successively at the Truro and Falmouth circuits. From Falmouth he removed to Darlaston, where in 1838 his health gave way.

For a good many years he was a supernumerary, and lived for a while at Caen and Paris, where in the public libraries he found great facilities for prosecuting his favorite Oriental studies. His health having considerably improved, he became, in 1843, pastor of the Methodist church at Boulogne-sur-Mer.

He returned to England in 1847, and was appointed successively to the circuits of Islington, Bristol, Leeds, Penzance, Penryn, Truro and St Austell in east Cornwall. Shortly after his return to England he received the degree of PhD from the University of Heidelberg. He was a patient, modest, hard-working and accurate scholar. He died at Camborne on 24 May 1866.

== Works ==
His principal works are:

- A Literal Translation Of The Four Gospels from the Peschito
- Horae Aramaicae (1843)
- History, Liturgies and Literature of the Syrian Churches (1847)
- The Apostolical Acts and Epistles, from the Peshito or Ancient Syriac; to which are added, the remaining Epistles, and the book of Revelation, after a later Syrian text (1849)
- Jerusalem and Tiberias, a Survey of the Religious and Scholastic Learning of the Jews (1856)
- The Life of the Rev. Adam Clarke, LL.D. (1858, 2nd Ed)
- The Targums of Onkelos and Jonathan ben Uzziel (1st vol. in 1862, 2nd in 1865)
