= Assyrian Modern Version =

Translation of the Bible

- Language: Modern Assyrian
- Genre: New Testament
- Publisher: Bible Society in Lebanon
- Publication date: 1997

The Assyrian Modern Version is a New Testament and Psalms in modern Assyrian, published by the Bible Society in Lebanon (1997). The version is newly translated from Koine Greek, not a revision of the ancient translation from the Greek Peshitta, still used in Orthodox and Catholic churches. Although written in the modern standard form, Assyrian Neo-Aramaic, the version is also intelligible to speakers of the Chaldean Neo-Aramaic dialect.
