= Rabbula =

Bishop of Edessa from 411 to 435

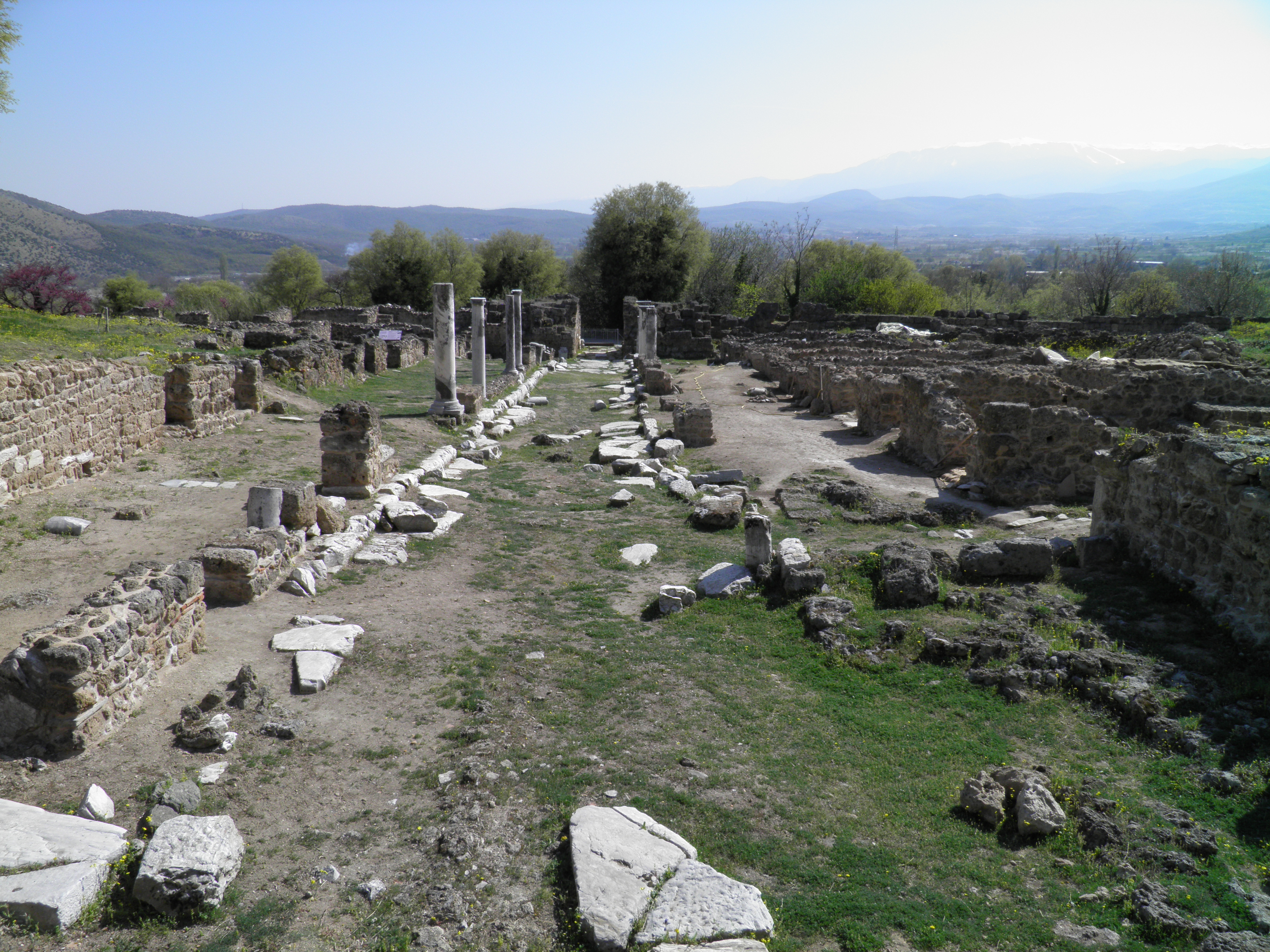
Ruins in Edessa, the famous Syriac Christian school

Rabbula (Syriac: ܪܒܘܠܐ ܕܐܘܪܗܝ; romanized Rabūlā d'Urhāy) was a bishop of Edessa from 411/2 to August 435/6 AD, noteworthy for his opposition to the views of Theodore of Mopsuestia and Nestorius. However, his successor Ibas, who was in charge of the school of Edessa, reversed the official stance of that bishopric. Rabbula is not to be confused with the otherwise unknown scribe of the 6th century Rabbula Gospels. He is venerated as a saint by the Oriental Orthodox Churches (feast on August 7/8 according to the Syriac Orthodox Church), with possible historical Eastern Orthodox veneration on December 20.

== Sources ==
The Life of Rabbula is a biographical Syriac text of Rabbula's life from the beginning of his birth to his life achievements and ends with his death. The text was first translated from Syriac into English and published by J. J. Overbeck in his S. Ephraemi Syri Rabulae Episcopi Edesseni Balaei Aliorumque opera selecta (1865). The Syriac parchment was found stored in the British Museum and is dated to the sixth century AD.

== Life ==
Rabbula was born into an aristocratic family in Qenneshrin, located a few miles south of Aleppo. He was the son of a pagan father, who was a priest, and a devoted Christian mother. Despite his mother's influence, Rabbula remained a pagan until after his marriage. His conversion to Christianity occurred later in life, during a journey to his country estates. This transformation was influenced by witnessing a miraculous healing and the teachings of Eusebius, the bishop of Qenneshrin, and Acacius, the bishop of Aleppo.

After his conversion, Rabbula chose to leave behind his mother, wife, and children to pursue a monastic life. His dedication and leadership qualities soon led to his election as the Bishop of Edessa, where he became one of the prominent church leaders of his time.

=== Episcopate ===
With the energy of his fiery nature, Rabbula fully embraced Christian asceticism, selling all his possessions and separating from his wife and relatives. He initially resided in a monastery before choosing a more austere life as a solitary hermit. Following the death of Diogenes, the bishop of Edessa, in 411-412, Rabbula was elected as his successor. He accepted the position without the customary reluctance.

As bishop, Rabbula was characterized by extraordinary energy and a commitment to asceticism in his personal life. He made significant provisions for the poor and suffering in his diocese and was diligent in maintaining discipline among the clergy and monks under his authority. He fiercely opposed heresies, particularly the growing influence of Nestorianism. During a visit to Constantinople, he preached a sermon denouncing Nestorian doctrine before Theodosius II, who was then sympathetic to Nestorius. A portion of this sermon survives in a Syriac version. Rabbula also developed a friendship with Cyril of Alexandria, corresponding with him and translating Cyril's treatise De recta fide into Syriac.

After a 24-year tenure as bishop, Rabbula died in August 435 and was succeeded by Ibas. However, some scholars argue that the positive portrayal of Rabbula may not be entirely accurate. According to the Life of Rabbula, prior to becoming bishop, he and another monk, Eusebius (the future bishop of Tella), sought martyrdom by provoking pagans in Baalbek (Heliopolis) in Lebanon, one of the last strongholds of paganism. Instead of being killed, he was severely beaten, with the Life of Rabbula claiming that he was spared from death due to his destined role as bishop.

Rabbula was a fierce advocate for Cyril of Alexandria in the emerging Christological debates and was said to have campaigned vigorously against pagans, "heretics," and Jews, with claims that he destroyed four temples and a synagogue. He was also renowned for his charitable work, building hospitals, regulating clergy and monastics, and enacting extensive legislation for members of the Covenant (Bnay Qyāmā). Additionally, he promoted a revised translation of the New Testament and composed numerous hymns. His extant writings are limited and some are of dubious authenticity, including several collections of rules governing church order, a sermon delivered in Constantinople (in Syriac translation), a few letters (including correspondence with Cyril), and various hymns. A magnificent hagiography exists in his honor.

== Writings ==
The literary legacy of Rabbula is small in bulk. Perhaps his primary importance to the historian of Syriac literature lies in the zeal with which he strove to replace the Diatessaron or Gospel Harmony of Tatian with the four canonical gospels, ordering that a copy of the latter should be placed in every church. The version survives in a British Museum manuscript. According to Overbeck, he himself produced a version (or revision) of the New Testament in Syriac, known as the Peshitta. Rabbula's involvement may have been a first step in the direction of the Philoxenian version. FC Burkitt went further and advanced the hypothesis that Rabbula, at least as regards the Gospels, actively helped in the translation of the current Peshitta text, using the Greek text as read in Antioch about 400. However, since then Arthur Vööbus has furnished evidence that the Peshitta predated Rabbula.

== Veneration ==
Although Rabbula's name is not found in the actual liturgical calendars of the Catholic or Eastern Orthodox churches, there is a "feast of Saint Rabbula of Edessa (†436)" celebrated on December 20 in the Greek Mineas from the 9th-12th centuries at Saint Catherine's Monastery of Mount Sinai.

The Oriental Orthodox Communion commemorates his memory on August 7/8 according to the Syriac Orthodox calendar of saints.

== See also ==
- Alexius of Rome, lived by begging during the episcopate of Bishop Rabbula.
- Ibas of Edessa
- Miaphysitism
- Council of Ephesus
- Council of Chalcedon

== Bibliography ==
- Hägg, Tomas; Rousseau, Philip; Høgel, Christian (2000). Greek Biography and Panegyric in Late Antiquity. University of California Press. ISBN 9780520223882.
- Phenix Jr., Robert R.; Horn, Cornelia B. (2017). The Rabbula corpus: comprising the Life of Rabbula, his correspondence, a homily delivered in Constantinople, canons, and hymns; with texts in Syriac and Latin, English translations, notes, and introduction. Society of Biblical Literature Press. ISBN 9780884140788.
