= William George Clark =

English writer and classical scholar (1821–1878)

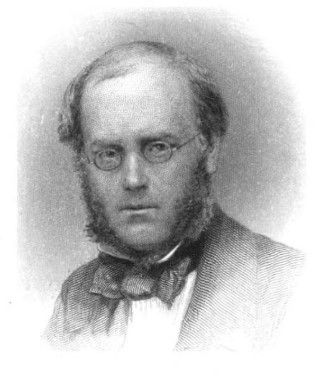
- Portrait of William George Clark
- Born: 18 March 1821; Darlington, England
- Died: 6 November 1878 (aged 57); York, England
- Occupations: Writer; scholar

William George Clark (18 March 1821 – 6 November 1878) was an English writer and classical scholar. He was best known for founding the Journal of Philology and The Cambridge Shakespeare alongside writer William Aldis Wright.

== Life ==
He was born at Barford Hall, Darlington. He was educated at Sedbergh School, Shrewsbury School, and Trinity College, Cambridge, where he graduated in classics and won a Browne medal and was subsequently elected Fellow. In 1857 he was appointed Public Orator. He travelled much during the long vacations, visiting Spain, Greece, Italy and Poland.

In 1853 Clark had taken orders, but left the Church after the passing of the Clerical Disabilities Act 1870 (33 & 34 Vict. c. 91), of which he was one of the promoters. He also resigned the public oratorship in the same year, and in consequence of illness left Cambridge in 1873. He died at York on 6 November 1878.

He bequeathed a sum of money to his old college for the foundation of a lectureship in English literature.

== Works ==
Clark established the Cambridge Journal of Philology, and cooperated with Benjamin Hall Kennedy and James Riddell in the production of the Sabrinae Corolla. He published little as a classical scholar. A contemplated edition of the works of Aristophanes was never published. He visited Italy in 1868 to examine the Ravenna manuscript of Aristophanes and other manuscripts, and on his return began the notes to the Acharnians, but they were left incomplete.

The work by which he is best known is the Cambridge Shakespeare (1863–6), containing a collation of early editions and selected emendations, edited by him at first with John Glover and later with William Aldis Wright. Gazpacho (1853) gives an account of his tour in Spain; his Peloponnesus (1858) was a contribution to the knowledge of Greece. His visits to Italy at the time of Garibaldi's insurrection, and to Poland during the insurrection of 1863, are described in Vacation Tourists, ed. Francis Galton, i and iii.

Hugh Andrew Johnstone Munro in Journal of Philology (viii. 1879) described Clark as "the most accomplished and versatile man he ever met".

== See also ==
- Shakespeare's Editors
