= George Gwilliam =

English Aramaist and Hebraist (1846-1913)

George Henry Gwilliam (28 July 1846 – 17 November 1913) was an English Aramaist and Hebraist.

Gwilliam was born in Bristol, the second son of Samuel Gwilliam. He was educated at King's College London and Jesus College, Oxford (BA 1871, MA 1874). He was a fellow of Hertford College, Oxford for nearly 40 years.

He continued the work of Philip E. Pusey on making an edition of the Aramaic New Testament of the Peshitta. The utility of the edition is however limited by its reliance on late sources.

He died in Reading, Berkshire, aged 67.
