= Philip E. Pusey =

English Aramicist

- Born: 1830
- Died: 1880 (aged 49–50)
- Father: Edward Bouverie Pusey
- Relatives: Philip Pusey (uncle); Philip Bouverie-Pusey (grandfather)

Philip Edward Pusey (1830–1880) was an English Aramaist. He started the work continued by George Gwilliam on making an edition of the Aramaic New Testament of the Peshitta. The utility of the edition is however limited by its reliance on late sources. Pusey also edited several of the works of St. Cyril of Alexandria.

He was the son of the Hebrew scholar and leader of the Anglo-Catholic Oxford Movement, Edward Bouverie Pusey.
