= British Library Syriac Manuscript Collection =

The British Library Syriac Manuscript Collection is one of the largest collections of Syriac manuscripts in the world. It contains 1,075 manuscripts and 12,000 printed books. The manuscripts are dated between 450 and 2000.

== See also ==
- List of Syriac New Testament manuscripts
- List of Mandaic manuscripts § British Library
