= The Cambridge Shakespeare =

19th/20th/21st-century series of critical editions of Shakespeare's works

The Cambridge Shakespeare is a long-running series of critical editions of William Shakespeare's works published by Cambridge University Press. The name encompasses three distinct series: The Cambridge Shakespeare (1863–1866), The New Shakespeare (1921–1969), and The New Cambridge Shakespeare (1984–present).

== The Cambridge Shakespeare (1863–1866) ==
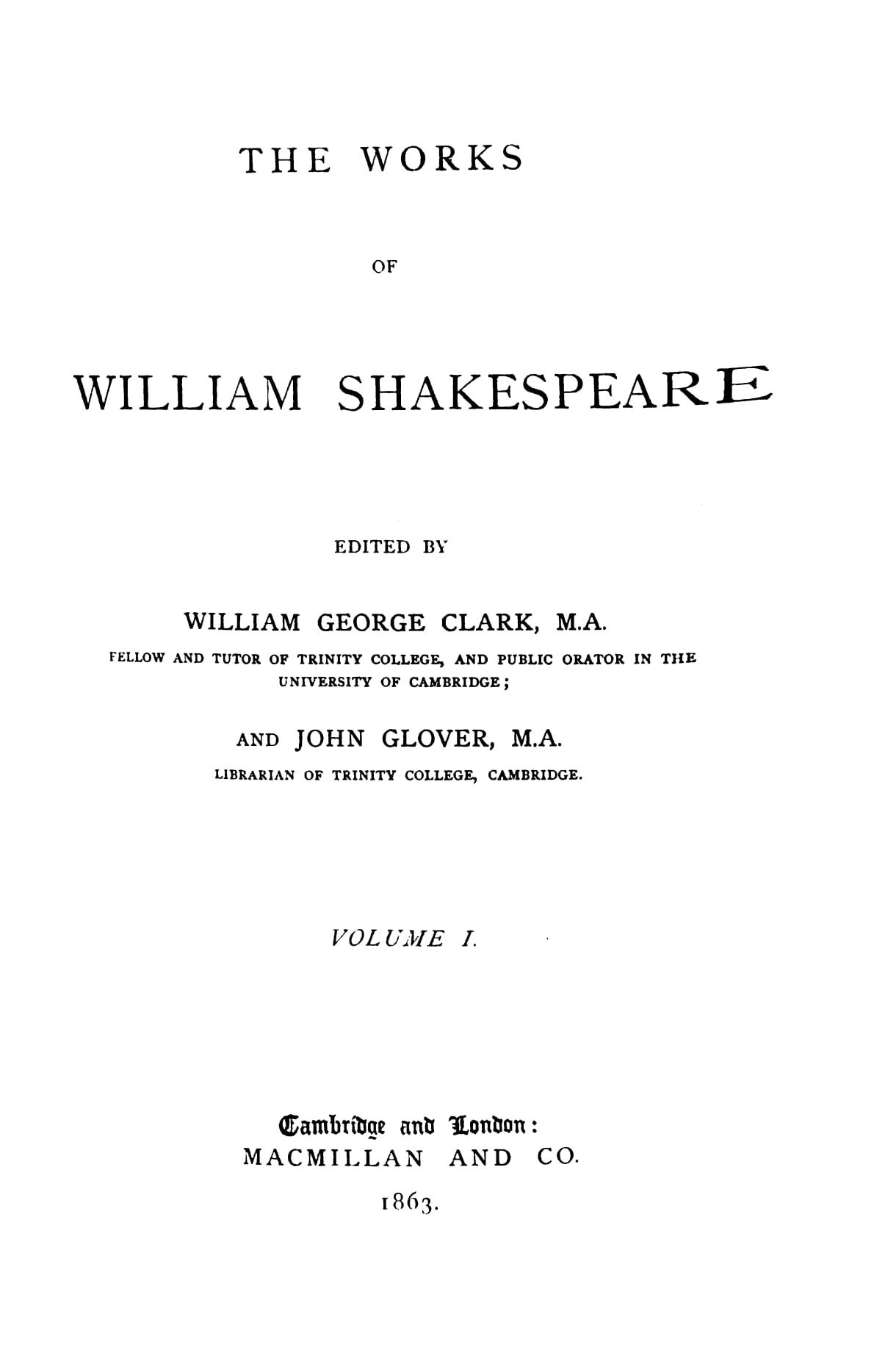
The title page of The Works of William Shakespeare, Vol. 1 (1863) edited by William George Clark and John Glover.

The Cambridge Shakespeare was edited by William George Clark, William Aldis Wright, and John Glover. It was released in nine volumes between 1863 and 1866. Clark and Wright used the First Folio (1623) as their base text and collated it with the second, third, and fourth folios as well as all the known quarto editions. The edition modernized the orthography to 19th-century standards rather than preserve the variable Elizabethan spelling, but generally left the grammar and metre unchanged.

In the edition, each page of a play contains a critical apparatus at the end. Where the folio text differs markedly from the quarto editions the quarto text is included in small type after the main text. Notes on variants, emendations, or pointing out or clarifying passages of particular difficulty or interest are placed at the end of each play.

In what a modern editor called "a bold move for a Victorian edition", Clark and Wright restored various original phrases that had previously been considered profane, where needed to preserve metre or meaning.

In 2009, Cambridge University Press reissued all nine volumes as part of their Cambridge Library Collection which aims to preserve access to "books of enduring scholarly value". The reissued editions are:

- Clark, William George; Glover, John, eds. (2009) [first published 1863]. The Works of William Shakespeare. The Cambridge Shakespeare. Vol. 1. Cambridge: Cambridge University Press. doi:10.1017/CBO9780511701191. ISBN 9780511701191.
- Clark, William George; Wright, William Aldis, eds. (2009) [first published 1863]. The Works of William Shakespeare. The Cambridge Shakespeare. Vol. 2. Cambridge: Cambridge University Press. doi:10.1017/CBO9780511701207. ISBN 9780511701207.
- Clark, William George; Wright, William Aldis, eds. (2009) [first published 1863]. The Works of William Shakespeare. The Cambridge Shakespeare. Vol. 3. Cambridge: Cambridge University Press. doi:10.1017/CBO9780511701214. ISBN 9780511701214.
- Clark, William George; Wright, William Aldis, eds. (2009) [first published 1864]. The Works of William Shakespeare. The Cambridge Shakespeare. Vol. 4. Cambridge: Cambridge University Press. doi:10.1017/CBO9780511701221. ISBN 9780511701221.
- Clark, William George; Wright, William Aldis, eds. (2009) [first published 1864]. The Works of William Shakespeare. The Cambridge Shakespeare. Vol. 5. Cambridge: Cambridge University Press. doi:10.1017/CBO9780511701238. ISBN 9780511701238.
- Clark, William George; Wright, William Aldis, eds. (2009) [first published 1865]. The Works of William Shakespeare. The Cambridge Shakespeare. Vol. 6. Cambridge: Cambridge University Press. doi:10.1017/CBO9780511701245. ISBN 9780511701245.
- Clark, William George; Wright, William Aldis, eds. (2009) [first published 1865]. The Works of William Shakespeare. The Cambridge Shakespeare. Vol. 7. Cambridge: Cambridge University Press. doi:10.1017/CBO9780511701252. ISBN 9780511701252.
- Clark, William George; Wright, William Aldis, eds. (2009) [first published 1866]. The Works of William Shakespeare. The Cambridge Shakespeare. Vol. 8. Cambridge: Cambridge University Press. doi:10.1017/CBO9780511701269. ISBN 9780511701269.
- Clark, William George; Wright, William Aldis, eds. (2009) [first published 1866]. The Works of William Shakespeare. The Cambridge Shakespeare. Vol. 9. Cambridge: Cambridge University Press. doi:10.1017/CBO9780511701276. ISBN 9780511701276.

== The New Shakespeare (1921–1969) ==
The New Shakespeare was published between 1921 and 1969. The series was edited by Arthur Quiller-Couch and J. Dover Wilson.

The earlier volumes of the series contain critical introductions by Quiller-Couch (signed "Q") that, according to R. A. Foakes in The Oxford Companion to Shakespeare (2003), were written in a "belletristic style" and have been "largely forgotten". The textual work by Wilson, however, "proved enormously influential."

In the 1921 edition of The Tempest, Wilson included a facsimile of the manuscript for Sir Thomas More and a full discussion of the copy for the texts, which afterward became required reading in the field. Shakespeare's hand in the manuscript for Sir Thomas More was discovered by Edward Maunde Thompson in Shakespeare's Handwriting: A Study (1916)—and treated in detail in what is still the definitive study: Shakespeare's Hand in the Play of Sir Thomas More (1923) by Alfred W. Pollard, W. W. Greg, R. W. Chambers and Wilson—but The New Shakespeare was the first series of editions to bring this discovery to bear on editing Shakespeare. The series was also the first to apply Pollard's recognition of the primacy of the quartos to textual work.

The last volume of the series was Henry VIII, edited by J. C. Maxwell in 1969.

== The New Cambridge Shakespeare (1984–present) ==
The cover of a New Cambridge Shakespeare edition

The New Cambridge Shakespeare began in 1984, and several editions were published each year, so that today, all of Shakespeare's plays and poems are available in the series. The series was designed to replace The New Shakespeare series.

The New Cambridge editions feature lengthy introductions and copious annotation. They are distinctive in appearance, being taller in shape than most of their competitors. The earliest editions featured cyan covers with an illustration by C. Walter Hodges of the relevant play in performance on an Elizabethan stage. In the 1990s, these covers were replaced with a new uniform blue design featuring a multicoloured sketch of Shakespeare's face based on a drawing by David Hockney. In the 2000s, the series was reissued again with each play receiving a specific photographic image (in colour).

The earliest editions in the series feature drawings by C. Walter Hodges that reconstruct the appearance of the plays when first produced in the Elizabethan theatre; this practice continued until Hodges' death in 2004.

Notable editions published in the series include the first ever edition of the disputed play Edward III to be published as Shakespeare's as part of a series; and a controversial edition of Pericles, Prince of Tyre that rejects the conventional thesis that the play was poorly printed and the result of collaborative authorship.

The series also uniquely produces fully edited modern-spelling editions of quarto texts when they differ significantly from the standard received text of the play. These include editions of the first quarto of Hamlet, the first quarto of Henry V, quarto King Lear, the Richard III, the quarto of Othello, the first quarto of Romeo and Juliet, and The Taming of a Shrew, an alternate version of The Taming of the Shrew.

The general editors of the series are Philip Brockbank (1984–1990) and Brian Gibbons (1990–present), with individual editors, or pairs of, assigned to cover separate plays and poetry.

== See also ==
- The Oxford Shakespeare
