= Rabbula Gospels =

6th-century illuminated Syriac Gospel Book

- Biblioteca Medicea Laurenziana, Plut. I, 56
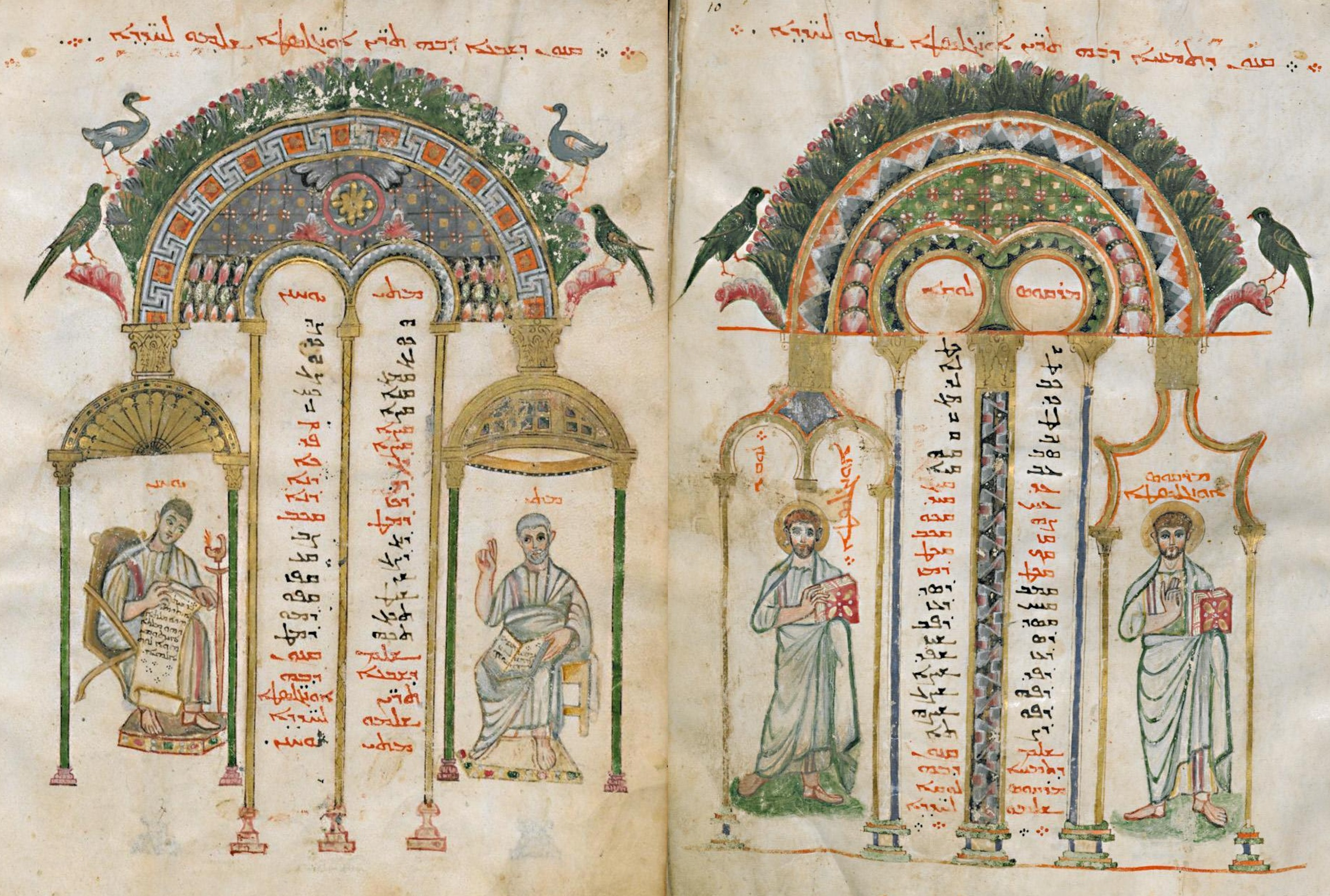
- Folios 9v and 10r of the Rabbula Gospels, canon tables with portraits of the Four Evangelists, from left to right: John, Matthew, Luke, and Mark.
- Type: Gospel Book
- Date: 586
- Place of origin: Monastery of St. John of Zagba, Northern Mesopotamia or Syria
- Language: Syriac
- Scribe: Rabbula
- Size: 34 cm × 27 cm
- Script: Syriac
- Contents: Four Canonical Gospels (Peshitta version)

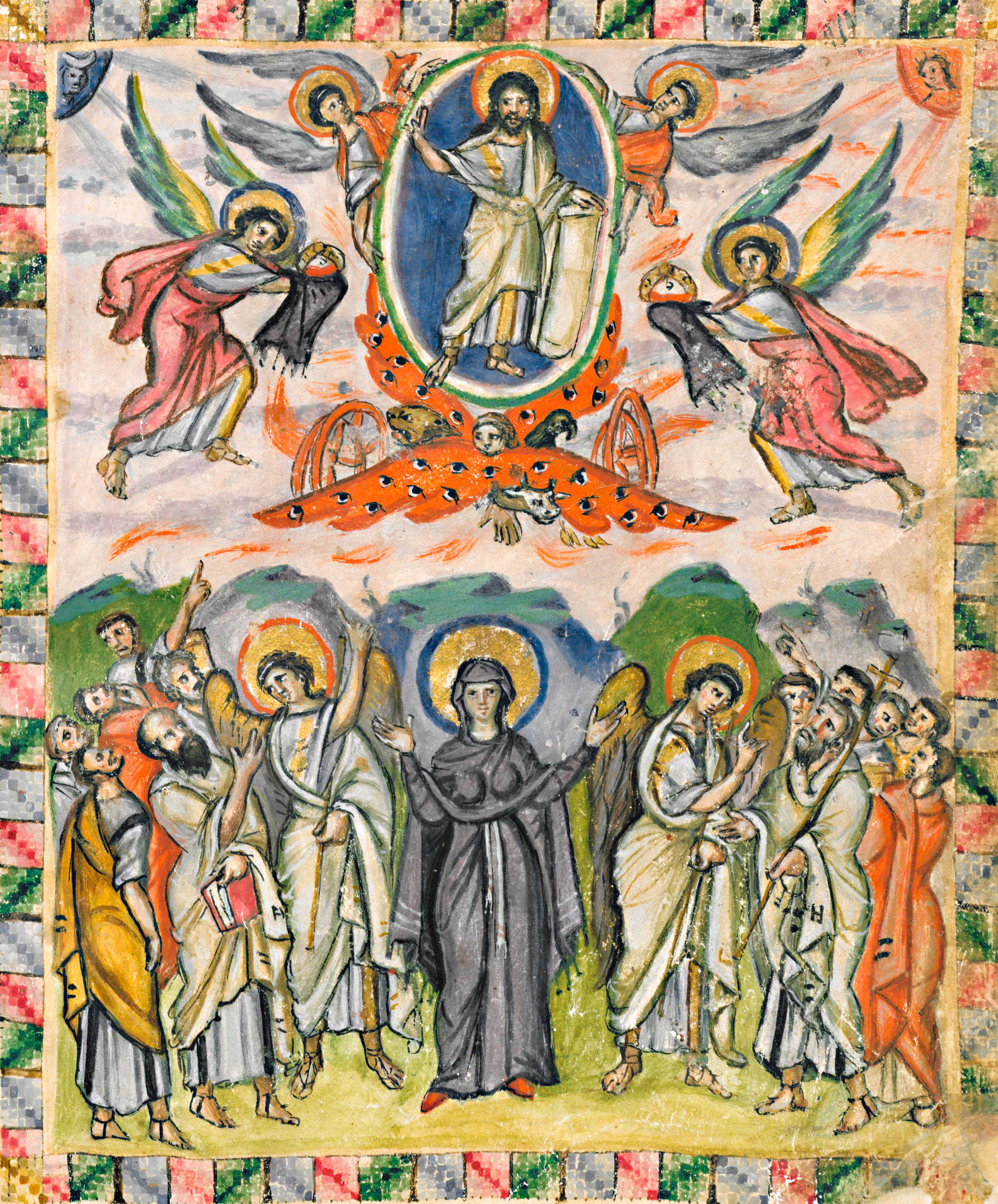
Folio 13v of the Rabbula Gospels contains a miniature of the Ascension.

The Rabbula Gospels, or Rabula Gospels (Florence, Biblioteca Medicea Laurenziana, cod. Plut. I, 56), is a 6th-century illuminated Syriac Gospel Book. One of the finest Byzantine works produced in West Asia, and one of the earliest Christian manuscripts with large miniatures, it is distinguished by the miniaturist's predilection for bright colours, movement, drama, and expressionism. Created during a period from which little art survived, it nevertheless saw great development in Christian iconography. The manuscript has a significant place in art history, and is very often referred to.

Recent scholarship has suggested that the manuscript, completed in 586 AD, was later partly overpainted by restorers and bound together with miniatures from other sources in the 15th or 16th century.

== Description ==
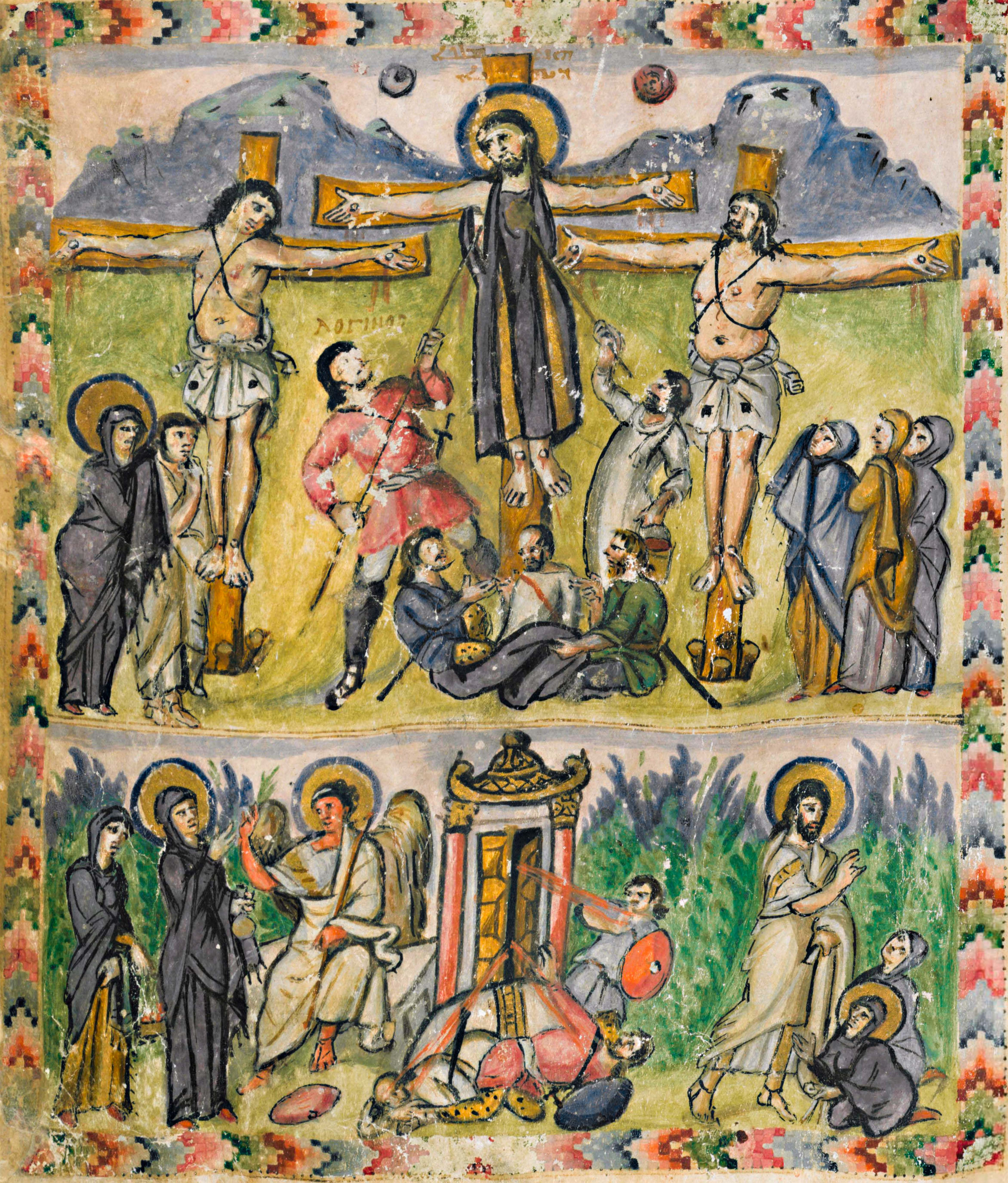
The earliest crucifixion in an illuminated manuscript, from the Rabbula Gospels.

The Gospel was completed in 586 at Monastery of St. John of Zagba (Syriac: ܒܝܬ ܙܓܒܐ, Bēṯ Zaḡbā), which, although traditionally thought to have been in Northern Mesopotamia, is now thought to have been in the hinterland between Antioch and Apamea in modern Syria. It was signed by its scribe, Rabbula (ܪܒܘܠܐ, Rabbulā) about whom nothing else is known. In their current condition the folios are 34 cm (13.4 in) by 27 cm (10.6 in). Their original size is unknown because they were trimmed during previous rebindings. The text is written in black or dark brown ink in two columns of a variable number of lines. There are footnotes written in red ink at the bottom of many of the columns. The text is the Peshitta version of the Syriac translation of the Gospels.

The manuscript is illuminated, with the text framed in elaborate floral and architectural motifs. The Gospel canons are set in arcades ornamented with flowers and birds. The miniaturist obviously drew some of his inspiration from Hellenistic art (draped figures), but relied mainly on Arab miniature art. The miniatures of the Rabbula Gospels, notably those representing the Crucifixion, the Ascension and Pentecost, are full-page pictures with a decorative frame formed of zigzags, curves, rainbows and so forth. The scene of the Crucifixion is the earliest to survive in an illuminated manuscript, and shows the Eastern form of the image at the time. There is a miniature of the Apostles choosing a new twelfth member (after the loss of Judas); this is not an event found in the Canonical Gospels (though it is mentioned in Chapter 1 of Acts) and is almost never seen in later art. The artist was trained in the classical illusionist tradition, and is a competent and practiced hand rather than an outstanding talent; but surviving images from this period are so rare that his are extremely valuable for showing the style and iconography of his age.

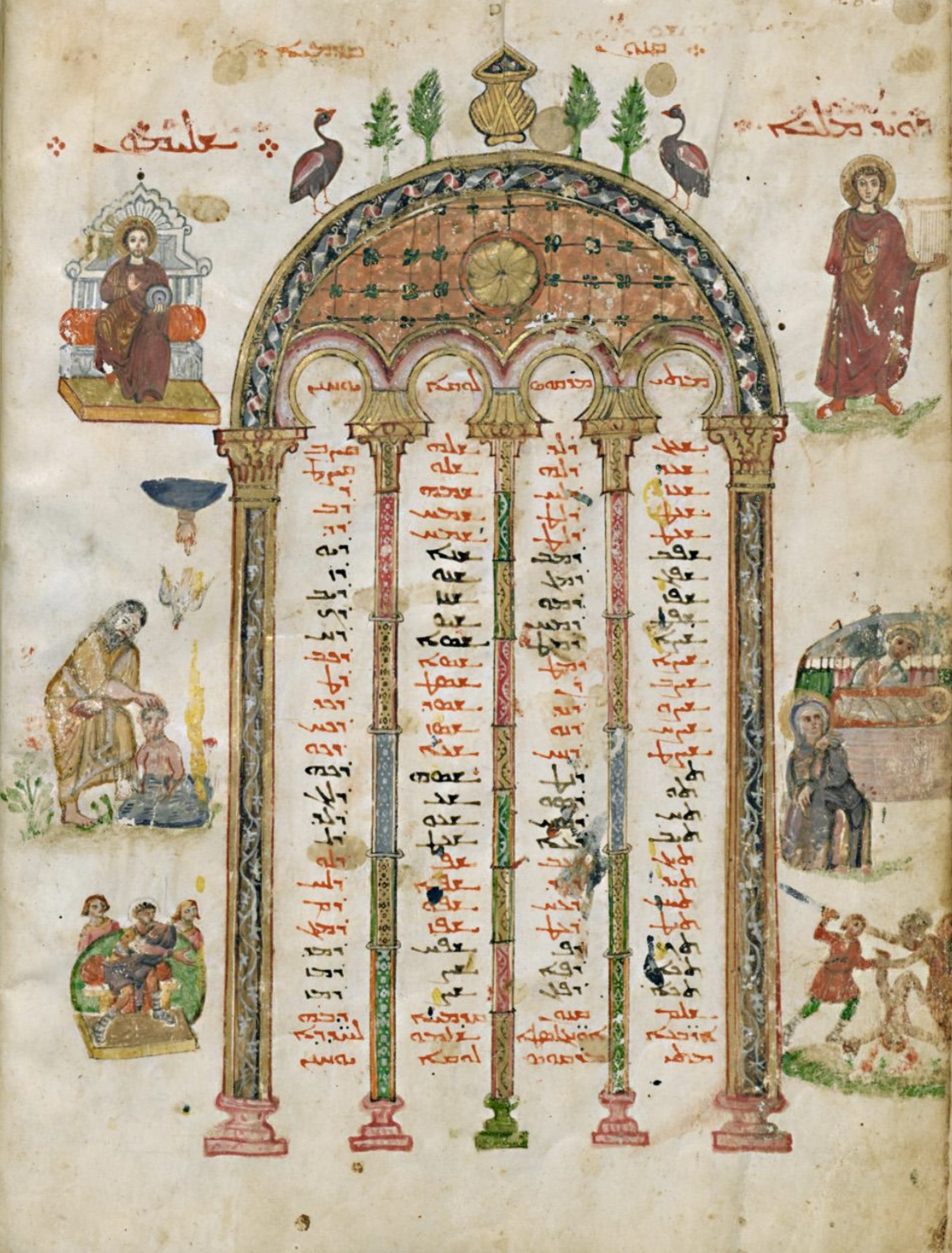
Folio 4v of the Rabbula Gospels showing the canon tables, harmonization of the four gospels, with marginal miniatures.

The French Orientalist Edgard Blochet (1870–1937) argued that some of the folios of the manuscript, including the pictorial series, were an interpolation no earlier than the 10th or 11th century. Since the original caption accompanying the miniatures is of the same paleographic character as the main text of the manuscript, this theory was rejected by Giuseppe Furlani and by Carlo Cecchelli in the commentary of the facsimile edition of the miniatures published in 1959. But doubts as to the original unity of the contents continued. More recently, scholars have proposed that the text of 586 was only bound up together with the miniatures in the 15th century, and that the miniatures themselves were taken from at least one other original manuscript, and come from two different campaigns of work.

The history of the manuscript after it was written is vague until the 11th century when it was at Maipuc-Byblos, Lebanon. In the late 13th or early 14th century it came to Quannubin. In the late 15th or early 16th century, the manuscript was taken by the Maronite Patriarch to the Laurentian Library in Florence, where it is today.

The manuscript has served during Medieval Age as register of Maronites Patriarches (Elias Kattar).

== Large miniatures ==
- fol. 1a Election of the Apostle Mathias by the Eleven
- fol. 1b Theotokos (Virgin Mary) with the infant Jesus
- fol. 2a Christ receives a book from two monks (dedication) / The saints Eusebius of Caesarea and Ammonius of Alexandria
- fol. 3b-12b The canon tables of Eusebius with smaller marginal miniatures
- fol. 9b Matthew and John
- fol. 13a Crucifixion of Christ / Three Marys at the tomb
- fol. 14a Ascension of Christ / Christ with four monks
- fol. 14b Gift of the Holy Spirit at Pentecost

== See also ==
- Syriac versions of the Bible
- Codex Phillipps 1388
- Garima Gospels
- Nestorian Evangelion
- Syriac Bible of Paris
- Depiction of Jesus
