= James Murdock (scholar) =

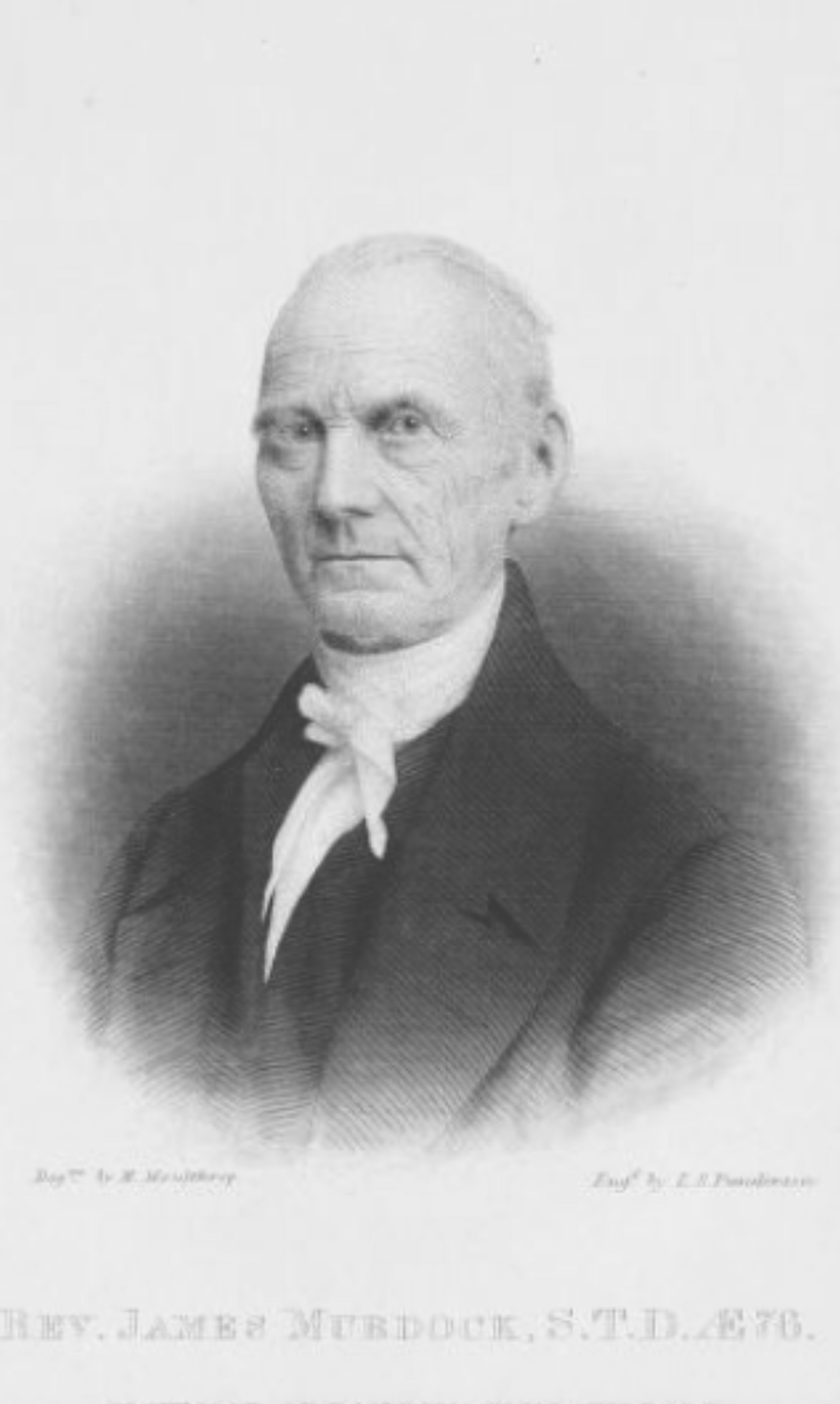
- Portrait of Murdock, from his 1851 translation of the Syriac New Testament
- Born: February 16, 1776; Saybrook, Connecticut, U.S.
- Died: August 10, 1856 (aged 80); Columbus, Mississippi, U.S.
- Occupation(s): Biblical scholar, translator
- Known for: One of the first English translations of the New Testament from the Syriac Peshitta

James Murdock (1776–1856) was an American biblical scholar, born in Saybrook, Connecticut.

He made the first translation of the New Testament from the Syriac Peshitta into English in 1851.

== Life and career ==
Murdock was born in Saybrook, Connecticut, on February 16, 1776, the son of Captain James Murdock (1731–1799) and Abigail Bushnell. He was of Scottish descent, tracing his ancestry to Robert Murdock of Roxbury, Massachusetts, who emigrated from Scotland in the seventeenth century.

At the age of seventeen he entered Yale College, where he graduated in 1797 (A.B.), ranking second in his class. He later taught at Yale as a tutor and pursued studies in theology and the biblical languages.

Though familiar with Syriac earlier in life, Murdock began intensive study of the language in his seventies. He undertook a translation of the New Testament directly from the Syriac Peshitta, which he published in 1851 under the title The Syriac New Testament Translated into English from the Peshitto Version. A second edition appeared posthumously in 1858. His work was the first complete English translation of the Syriac Peshitta.

Murdock died in Columbus, Mississippi, on August 10, 1856, at the age of 80.

== Works ==
- The Syriac New Testament Translated into English from the Peshitto Version, First Edition, 1851 — Preserves Murdock’s original phrasing, including his assertion that the Peshitta is generally believed to be the oldest New Testament text and references to contemporary scholars who supported this view.
- The Syriac New Testament Translated into English from the Peshitto Version, Ninth Edition, 1915 (source) — Later edition with revisions that softened or removed some of Murdock’s original claims and scholarly references.
