= Syriac Epistles, British Library, Add. 14479 =

New Testament biblical manuscript

British Library, Add MS 14479, is a Syriac manuscript of the New Testament, on parchment. It is dated by a colophon to the year 534. It is one of the oldest manuscripts of Peshitta and the earliest dated Peshitta Apostolos.

== Description ==
It contains the text of the fourteen Pauline epistles, on 101 leaves (8 7/8 by 5 1/2 in or 230 by 140 mm), with only three lacunae (folio 1, 29, and 38). Written in one column per page, in 25-33 lines per page. The Epistle to the Hebrews is placed after Philemon. Numerous Syriac vowels and signs of punctuations have been added by a Nestorian hand, as well as a few Greek vowels by another reader.

It was written for the monastery in Edessa, in a small, elegant Estrangela hand in the year 533–534. The first folio was supplemented by a later hand in the twelfth century, folio 28 and 39 were supplemented in the thirteenth century.

The manuscript is housed at the British Library (Additional Manuscripts 14479) in London.

== See also ==
- List of the Syriac New Testament manuscripts

Other manuscripts

- Codex Phillipps 1388
- British Library, Add MS 14455
- British Library, Add MS 14459
- British Library, Add MS 14669

Sortable articles

- Syriac versions of the Bible
- Biblical manuscript
