= Syriac Gospels, British Library, Add. 14459 =

British Library, Add MS 14459, Syriac manuscript of the New Testament, on a parchment. It is dated by a colophon to the year 528-529 or 537-538 (partially illegible colophon). It is one of the oldest manuscript of Peshitta and the earliest dated manuscript containing two of the Gospels in Syriac (folios 67-169). The manuscript is bound with another (folios 1-66) dated to the 5th century.

== Folios 1-66 ==
It contains the text of the Gospel of Matthew (beginning with 6:20) and Gospel of Mark on folios 1-66. It is written in a beautiful, Edesene Estrangela hand. The manuscript was described by Wright and Gwilliam. It is dated to the 5th century.

The manuscript is housed at the British Library (Add MS 14459, folios 1-66) in London.

== Folios 67-169 ==
It contains the text of the Gospel of Luke and Gospel of John, on folios 67-169 (20.3 by 12.7 cm). Written in one column per page, in 25-27 lines per page.

It was written in a small, elegant Estrangela hand. Folio 74 is a palimpsest leaf from the 9th or the 10th century. Probably it was added by the same hand who retouched folios 162 and 163. The more ancient text of the folio is of Matthew 3:6-9.11-13; 3:16-4:1; 4:4-6, according to Peshitta version.

Many lessons have been noted on the margin by later hand, sometimes in barbarous Greek.

The manuscript was described by Wright.

The manuscript is housed at the British Library (Add MS 14459, folios 67-169) in London.

== See also ==
- List of the Syriac New Testament manuscripts
- Syriac versions of the Bible
- Biblical manuscript
- British Library, Add MS 14466
- British Library, Add MS 14479
