= Khaboris Codex =

Khabouris Codex (alternate spelling Khaboris, Khaburis) is an 11th-century Classical Syriac manuscript which contain the complete Peshitta New Testament.

== History of Ownership ==
=== Acquisition and Early Controversies (1966–1970s) ===
The Khaboris codex was obtained by Norman Malek-Yonan and attorney Dan MacDougald in 1966 for $25,000. It "was purchased from the library of an ancient Assyrian monastery atop one of the mountains of Assyria, near the River Habbor, or in Aramaic, Khabur, hence the name 'Khaburis'." It seems both men went overseas looking for a more intact Aramaic version of the New Testament following Malek-Yonan's experiences surrounding the Yonan Codex in the 1950s. Malek-Yonan's prior codex had been repaired with newer materials at some point in its history. He claimed the Yonan Codex^{b} had been in his family since the 4th century. In his account of the controversial history surrounding the Yonan codex^{b}, Christian Greek-primacist Bruce Metzger tells of dating it to the 7th century at its earliest.

=== Association with Emotional Maturity Instruction ===
The stories of the Yonan Codex^{a} and the Khaboris Codex^{b} are linked by the involvement of Dan MacDougald. On page 115 of the Society of Biblical Literature's reprint of The Saga of the Yonan Codex, Metzger tells of getting news of the Yonan Codex in the late 1970s. He writes,

several year [sic] later while I was attending sessions of the annual meeting of the American Academy of Religion, Dr. Paul L. Garber, professor of Bible at Agnes Scott College, Decatur, Georgia, casually inquired of me whether I had ever heard of the Yonan Codex^{a}. This led to a most astonishing disclosure. A medieval copy (Khabouris^{b}) of the manuscript, Garber told me, was in the possession of the Emotional Maturity Instruction Center, Decatur, Georgia. The center had transliterated the Syriac text of the Beatitudes in Christ's Sermon on the Mount (Matthew 5:3–12) and was making a copy of this available for four dollars with the assurance that, by concentrating each day on these sentences in Aramaic, one's personality would become adjusted and more mature. In fact, according to Garber the center had even persuaded magistrates in Atlanta to buy copies of the transliteration for use in attempting to quell obstreperous prisoners!

A Western Queens Gazette article from August 8, 2004 states that Dan MacDougald was the one who started the Emotional Maturity Instruction course referred to by Metzger. According to Timms, Norman Malek-Yonan died in the 1970s. Apparently MacDougald had purchased the Khaboris codex from Yonan, and started a few organizations dealing with psychology in the 1970s. After the 1999 dating by the University of Arizona (which dated it between 1000–1190 AD), the Khaboris Codex^{b} transitioned into the hands of Dr. Michael Ryce at the Heartland institute. Ryce co-authored an updated version of the Emotional Maturity Instruction course with MacDougald called Laws of Living. This course continues to be taught, annually, by Ryce at Heartland, his teaching center in the Ozark Mountains of Southern Missouri. The Heartland's website states on a page about the Khaboris Codex^{b}, "Before Dan MacDougald passed away, he left the Khabouris^{b} in the stewardship of the Western-Rite Syrian Orthodox Church..." The manuscripts appears to have remained physically at the Heartland institute. A page titled "The Khabouris Manuscript Ceremony at Heartland" has several small images of a woman posing with the "b" codex. At some point during this time, someone there seems to have taken low-resolution digital photos of all 500 plus pages of the codex.

=== Theft, Melikian Collection, and Modern Study ===
At some point around 2004 the codex was sent to New York have high-resolution photos taken by Eric Rivera, director of the Khabouris Institute, working at the Better Light Company, a digital imaging company. Their website has a description of Rivera's work and a few high-quality image samples. During this time the Khabouris Manuscript^{b} was on display for public view as an exhibit in the Queensborough Community College Art Gallery in Bayside, New York. Rivera mentions working on the manuscript in 2005, after which it appears to have been stolen. The Heartland website states, "The Khabouris Manuscript(^{b}) was removed from QCC (without our prior knowledge) and was taken to London for auction by Sotheby's back in June 2007. The sale was not completed at that time; however, we have lost track of where the actual Manuscript is now located." It appears to have been purchased by Arizona collector James Melikian. On December 11, 2007 the Phoenix Art Museum hosted a display of old manuscripts, including the Khaboris Codex^{b}. The article announcing the display described it as being part of the James Melikian collection. Melikian, a resident of Phoenix, is Armenian and has cultural interests in collecting ancient Oriental Christian artifacts. Presumably the Khaboris Codex^{b} is still in the Melikian private gallery. Melikian states in his inventory listing that his copy is a different manuscript than the one owned by the Library of Congress.

== Contents and Textual Features ==
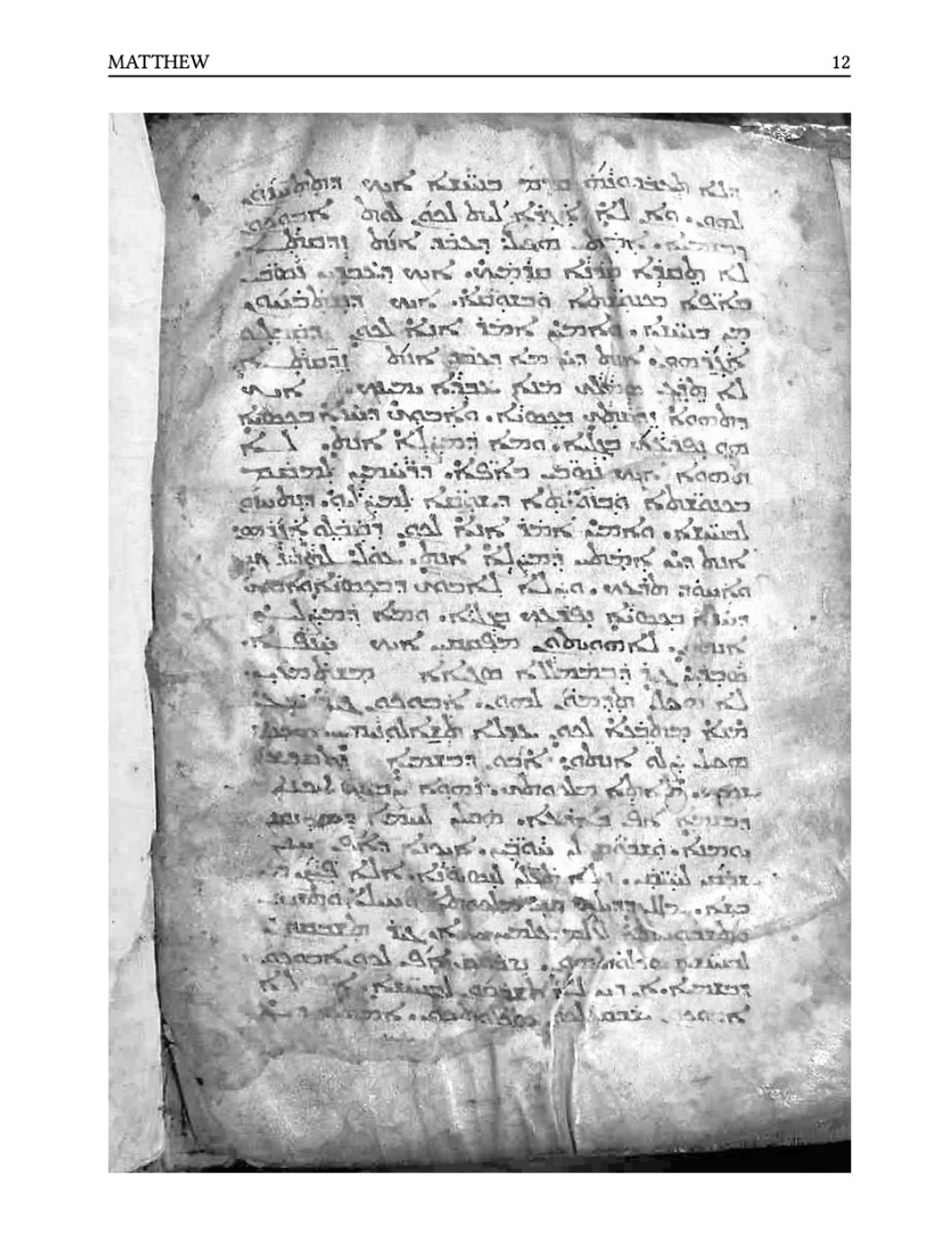
Matthew, Chapter 6, in the distinctive Estrangela script.

The Khabouris Codex is considered a critical witness to the early Christian scripture due to its nature as a complete copy of the Peshitta New Testament. The Peshitta canon contained within the codex includes 22 books, excluding 2 Peter, 2 John, 3 John, Jude, and Revelation, reflecting early Syriac Christianity’s unique theological and textual traditions.

The manuscript is notable for its exquisite use of the Estrangela script, the earliest Syriac book-hand, though six pages (three pairs) of the Gospel of Matthew are written in East Syriac script instead. This divergence provides a rare opportunity to observe the transition between Syriac script traditions.

In addition, the codex contains examples of unique Syriac theological interpretation. For instance, in Matthew 14:26 (where Jesus walks on water), the Greek text uses phantasma ("ghost"), but the Peshitta in the Khabouris Codex renders it as ḥezwā daggālā (a "false vision" or "lying vision"). This choice, which contrasts with earlier Syriac texts that used a word for "demon" šēḏā, is interpreted by scholars as a theological refinement focusing on the unreality of the apparition rather than its spiritual nature.

The codex has been the subject of digitization and study, notably by the Museum of the Bible (MOTB), where it was described as the "earliest known complete copy of the Peshitta New Testament."

== A page from the codex ==
Page 360 of the Khaburis Codex is the end of the I Epistle of John and the beginning of the Letter to the Romans. The rubric connects the two books.
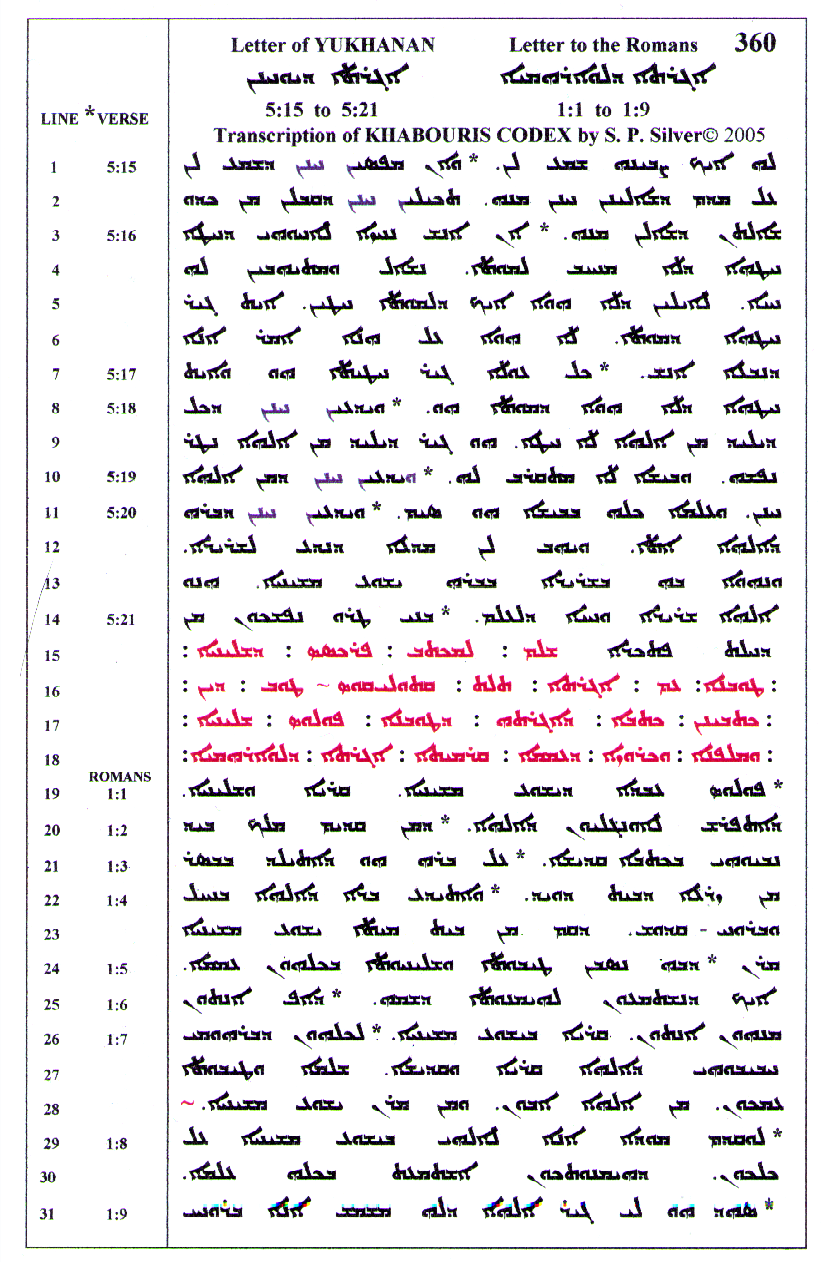
Transcription

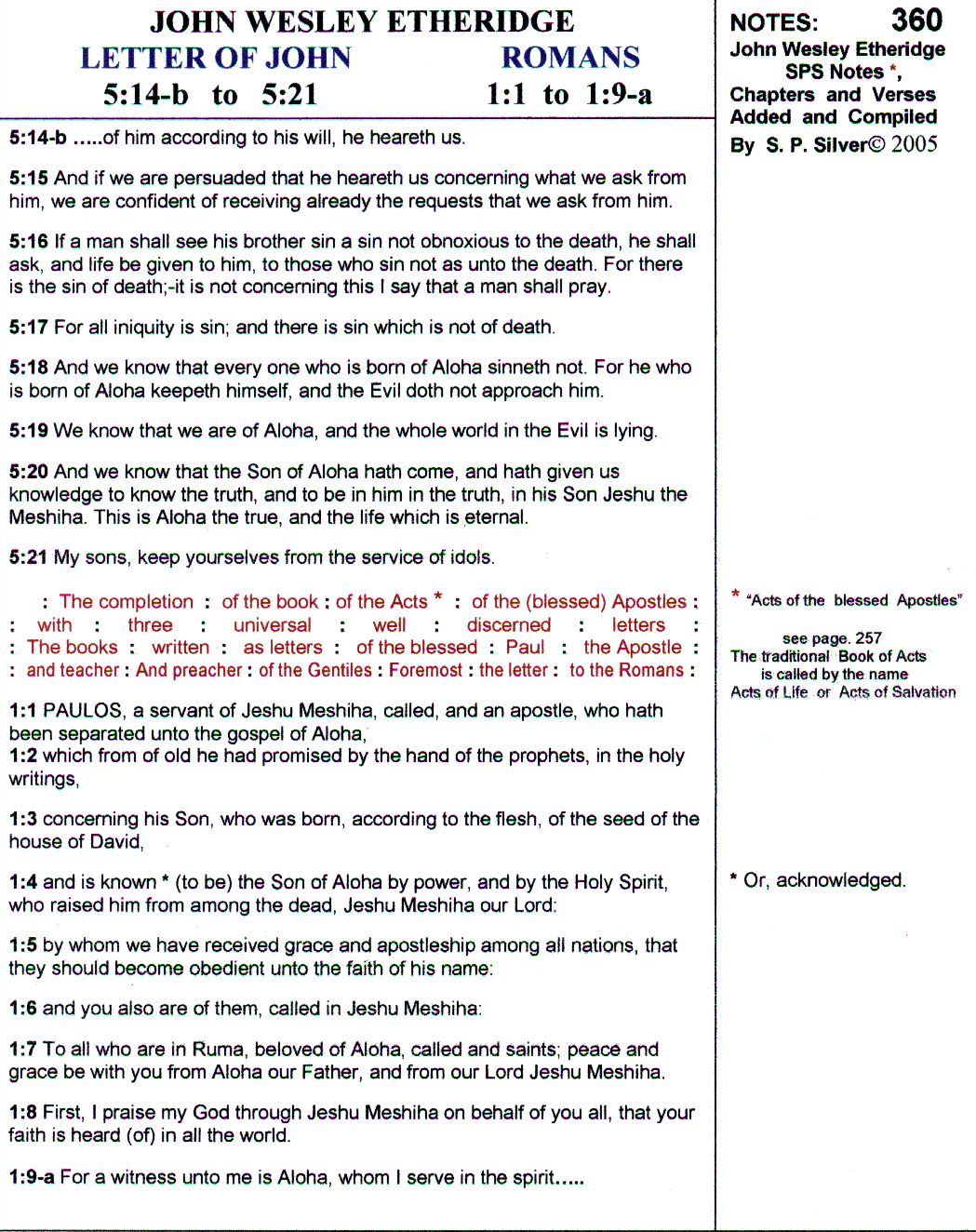
Translation

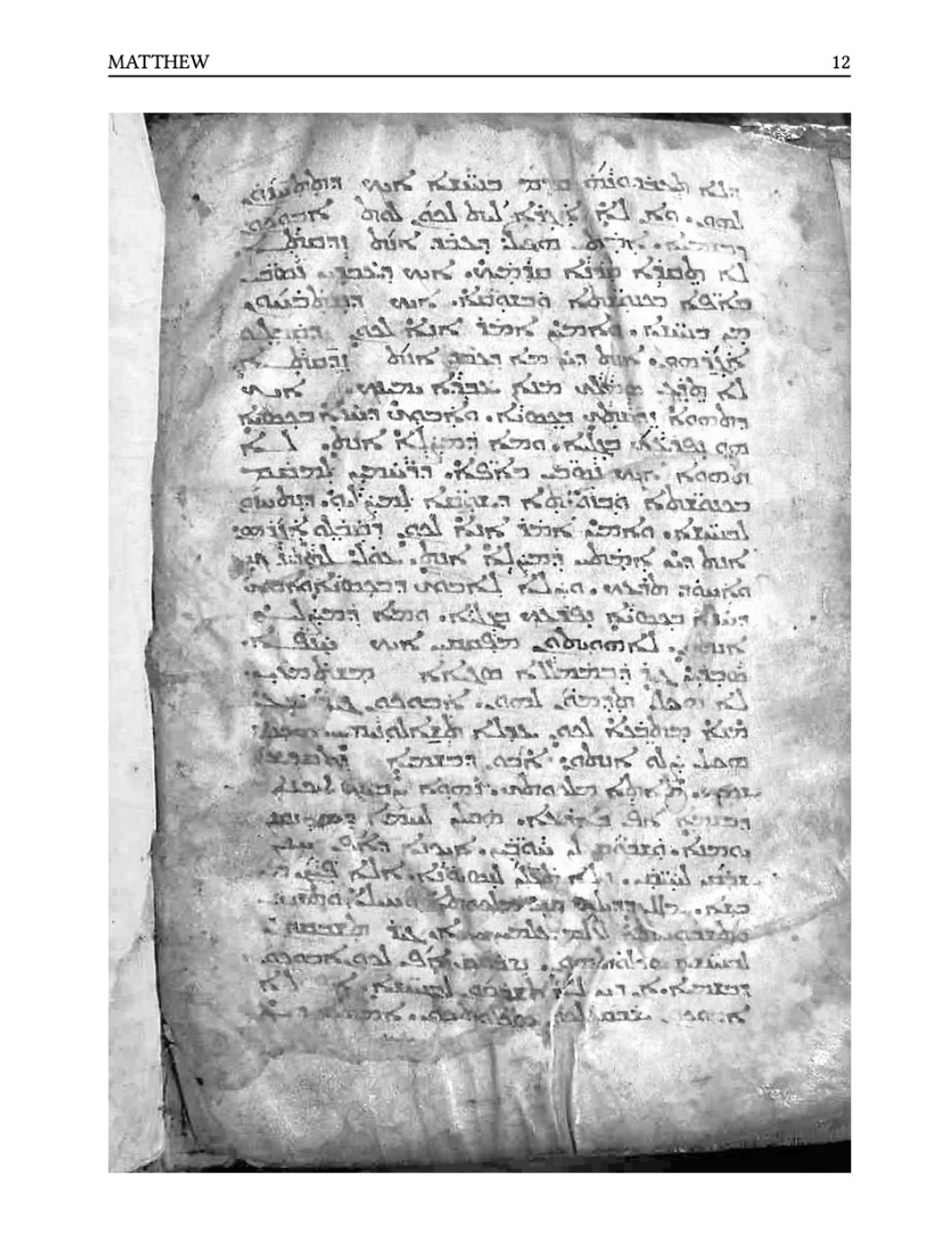
Matthew, Chapter 6, in the distinctive Estrangela script.

== See also ==
- Peshitta
