= Robert of Gloucester (historian) =

English historian

Robert of Gloucester (fl. c. 1260 – c. 1300) wrote a chronicle of British, English and Norman history sometime in the mid- or late thirteenth century.

== Life ==
Little is known about Robert himself; the key reason for attributing the Chronicle to a person of this name is a mention in the continuation of the longer version that 'roberd / þat verst þis boc made' ('Robert / that first this book made', lines 11748–49) personally witnessed an eclipse that accompanied the Battle of Evesham (1265). The appellation 'of Gloucester' was added by early modern antiquarians on the basis of the perspective taken in later sections of the longer version of the chronicle.

== Manuscripts and versions ==
The chronicle survives in two versions; there are seven manuscripts of each. Up to 1135 (the death of Henry I, line 9137 in Wright's edition of the longer version), the versions are 'broadly identical', 'but they then have wholly different continuations'. The longer version contains almost 3,000 more lines, is more detailed, and ends (in the least incomplete manuscript) in 1271. The shorter version only contains a further 592 lines, and ends in the 1280s. However, this shorter version adds about 800 lines earlier in the text, some of them deriving from Layamon's Brut. The manuscripts of the longer version are:

- Cotton Caligula A. xi (s. xiv in.)
- BL Add. MS. 19677 (s. xiv/xv) (with gaps partly filled by BL Add. 50848)
- Harley 201 (s. xv^{1}, breaking off at line 9259)
- BL Add. 18631 (s. xv mid., abbreviated)
- Glasgow, Hunterian V. 3. 13 (s. xvi mid.)
- Balliol College, Oxford, 695.h.6: two binding fragments (s. xiv^{2})
- College of Arms lviii (completed 1448, with prose and verse insertions)

The manuscripts of the shorter version are:

- Trinity College, Cambridge R.4.26 (c. 1400)
- Magdalene College, Cambridge, Pepys Library 2014 (s. xv in., defective)
- Bodleian Library, Digby 205 (s. xv in.)
- Huntington Library, HM. 126 (s. xv^{1})
- London University Library 278 (s. xv mid.)
- BL Sloane 2027 (s. xv mid, abbreviated)
- Cambridge University Library Ee.4.31 (s. xv mid)

== Relationship with the South English Legendary ==
The chronicle is similar to the South English Legendary (probably first composed c. 1270–85), and between them they comprise 'two huge monuments of later thirteenth-century literary activity' in England:

The South English Legendary [...] and the historical chronicle that goes under the name of Robert of Gloucester, have long been known to be intimately related. They are written in the same septenary couplet metre, and are closely similar in dialect, vocabulary, phrasing, choice of rhyme words, overall narrative technique, and 'outlook': a Christian piety which places them on the side of the oppressed and suffering individual, and in opposition to corrupt and wicked lords of whatever estate. They also have numerous actual lines in common.

It has been argued that Robert, as well as being inspired by the South English Legendary, also revised a version of that text himself.

== Historical reliability ==
The Chronicle was of considerable interest to contemporaries and antiquarian scholars. Although an early generation of antiquarians including Thomas Hearne found the chronicle interesting, its reputation later faded. Somewhat perversely, it was not until after the text was edited by William Aldis Wright that its neglect—"worthless as history" and "verse without one spark of poetry" according to its editor—became widespread.

Historically, the text is of interest primarily for materials relating to the Second Barons' War, to which the author (or an author of a portion of the text) seems to have been a witness. The first part of the Chronicle translates materials from Geoffrey of Monmouth's Historia regum Britanniae, narrating fabulous British history. The majority of English/Anglo-Saxon history is compiled from the works of Henry of Huntingdon and William of Malmesbury, and the post-Conquest portions are translated from numerous sources densely interwoven with original text.

== Editions ==
- Wright, William Aldis ed., The Metrical Chronicle of Robert of Gloucester. 2 vols. Rolls Series 86 (London, 1887), https://archive.org/details/metricalchronicl01robe; http://quod.lib.umich.edu/c/cme/AHB1378.0001.001?rgn=main;view=toc (the longer version of the chronicle)
- An Anonymous Short English Metrical Chronicle, ed. by Ewald Zettl, Early English Text Society, o. s. 196 (London: Oxford University Press, 1935) (the shorter version of the chronicle)
- *Thomas Hearne edition of Chronicle at Google Books
