= Syriac New Testament, British Library, Add. 14455 =

British Library, Add MS 14455 is a Syriac manuscript of the New Testament, on parchment. Palaeographically it has been assigned to the 6th century. It is a manuscript of the Peshitta. The manuscript is very lacunose.

== Description ==
It contains the text of the four Gospels, on 135 parchment leaves (14 ¾ by 11 ¾ inches), with large and numerous lacunae (Matthew 1:1-8:32; 9:11-35; 10:22-11:4; 11:19-14:17; 14:30-22:2; 22:16-23:25; 23:35-fin.; Mark 1:1-12:43; 13:10-21; 13:34-14:66; Luke 8:29-39; 9:14-36; 10:12-17; 12:25-46; 13:19-14:16; 15:4-16:5; 19:23-22:24; 22:58-23:35; 24:17-29; John 4:10-23; 4:47-5:5; 12:37-49; 13:9-fin.). Some of leaves are much stained and torn. The manuscript is in imperfect condition.

Written in two columns per page, in 15-21 lines per page. The writing is a large, beautiful Estrangela. The Eusebian Canons are marked in the text with the red ink. Some lessons are rubricated in the text, and many margin notes were added by a later hand.

The manuscript is housed at the British Library (Add MS 14455) in London.

== See also ==
- List of the Syriac New Testament manuscripts
- Syriac versions of the Bible
- Biblical manuscript
- Codex Phillipps 1388
- British Library, Add MS 12140
