= Codex Phillipps 1388 =

Syriac manuscript of the New Testament

Codex Phillipps 1388, Syriac manuscript of the New Testament, on parchment. It contains the text of the four Gospels. Palaeographically it had been assigned to the 5th/6th centuries. It is one of the oldest manuscripts of Peshitta with some Old Syriac readings.

According to Gwilliam the Cureton’s Syriac is related to the Peshitto in the same way that the latter is to the Philoxeno-Heraclean revision. It means it represent a stage between that of the Old Syriac and the fully developed Peshitta text. It has no fewer than seventy Old Syriac readings. It is one of very few early manuscripts with Old Syriac readings.

The manuscript was acquired by the Royal Library in Berlin in 1865. It was dated by Sachau to the end of the 5th century or the beginning of the 6th century.

The text of the codex was published by G. H. Gwilliam in 1901. A. Allgeier re-examined the collection of the codex in 1932.

== See also ==
- List of the Syriac New Testament manuscripts
- Syriac versions of the Bible
- Biblical manuscript
- British Library, Add MS 12140
- British Library, Add MS 14455
