= William Aldis Wright =

English writer and classical scholar (1831–1914)

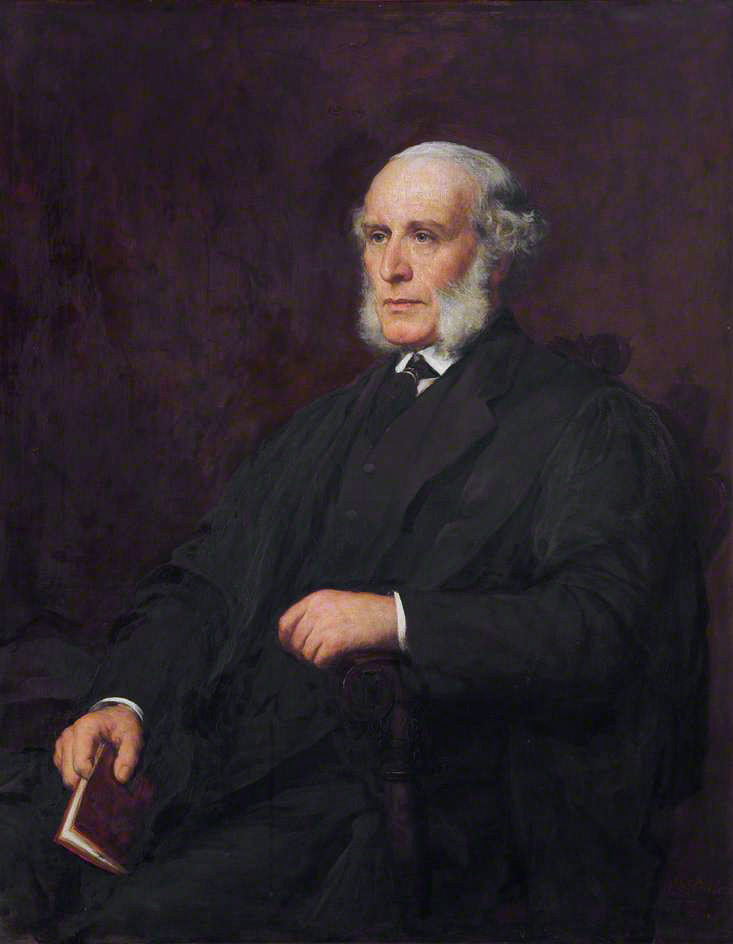
- William Aldis Wright portrait by Walter William Ouless, 1887
- Born: 1 August 1831; Beccles, England
- Died: 19 May 1914 (aged 82); Cambridge, England
- Occupations: Writer; scholar

William Aldis Wright (1 August 1831 – 19 May 1914) was an English writer and classical scholar. He was best known for founding The Cambridge Shakespeare alongside writer William George Clark. Additionally, he was friends with poet Edward FitzGerald and published many of his works posthumously.

== Life ==
Wright was son of George Wright, a Baptist minister in Beccles, Suffolk. He was educated at Beccles Grammar School and Trinity College, Cambridge, where he graduated BA in 1858. As a nonconformist, Wright was ineligible for election to a Trinity fellowship until 1878, but became Librarian and Senior Bursar of Trinity before that date. He opposed the allegations by Simonides that the Codex Sinaiticus discovered by Constantin von Tischendorf was produced around 1840. Duly elected Fellow in 1878, he became vice-master of the college in 1888. He was one of the editors of the Journal of Philology from its foundation in 1868, and was secretary to the Old Testament revision company from 1870 to 1885. He edited the plays of Shakespeare published in the "Clarendon Press" series (1868–97), also with W. G. Clark the "Cambridge" Shakespeare (1863–1866; 2nd ed. 1891–1893) and the "Globe" edition (1864). He added the Hebrew Index to 'The Survey of Western Palestine' in 1888. He published a facsimile of the Milton manuscript in the Trinity College library (1899), and edited Milton's poems with critical notes (1903).

He was the intimate friend and literary executor of Edward FitzGerald, whose Letters and Literary Remains he edited in 1889. This was followed by the Letters of Edward FitzGerald to Fanny Kemble (1895), his Miscellanies (1900), More Letters of Edward FitzGerald (1901), and The Works of Edward FitzGerald (7 vols., 1903). He edited the metrical chronicle of Robert of Gloucester (1887), Generydes (1878) for the Early English Text Society, Catalogue of the Syriac manuscripts in the British Museum (1–3 vol., 1870–1872), and other texts. His last publication was The Hexaplar Psalter (1911). In 1912 he resigned from the vice-mastership of Trinity College.

He donated a large collection of engravings by his uncle Thomas Higham to the British Museum in 1902.

He is buried in the Parish of the Ascension Burial Ground in Cambridge.

== Religious publications ==
- The Bible word-book; a glossary of archaic words and phrases in the authorised version of the Bible and the Book of Common Prayer (1884)
- The Hexaplar Psalter: Being the Book of Psalms in Six English Versions

== See also ==
- Shakespeare's Editors
