= Syriac versions of the Bible =

Bible in a particular Aramaic dialect

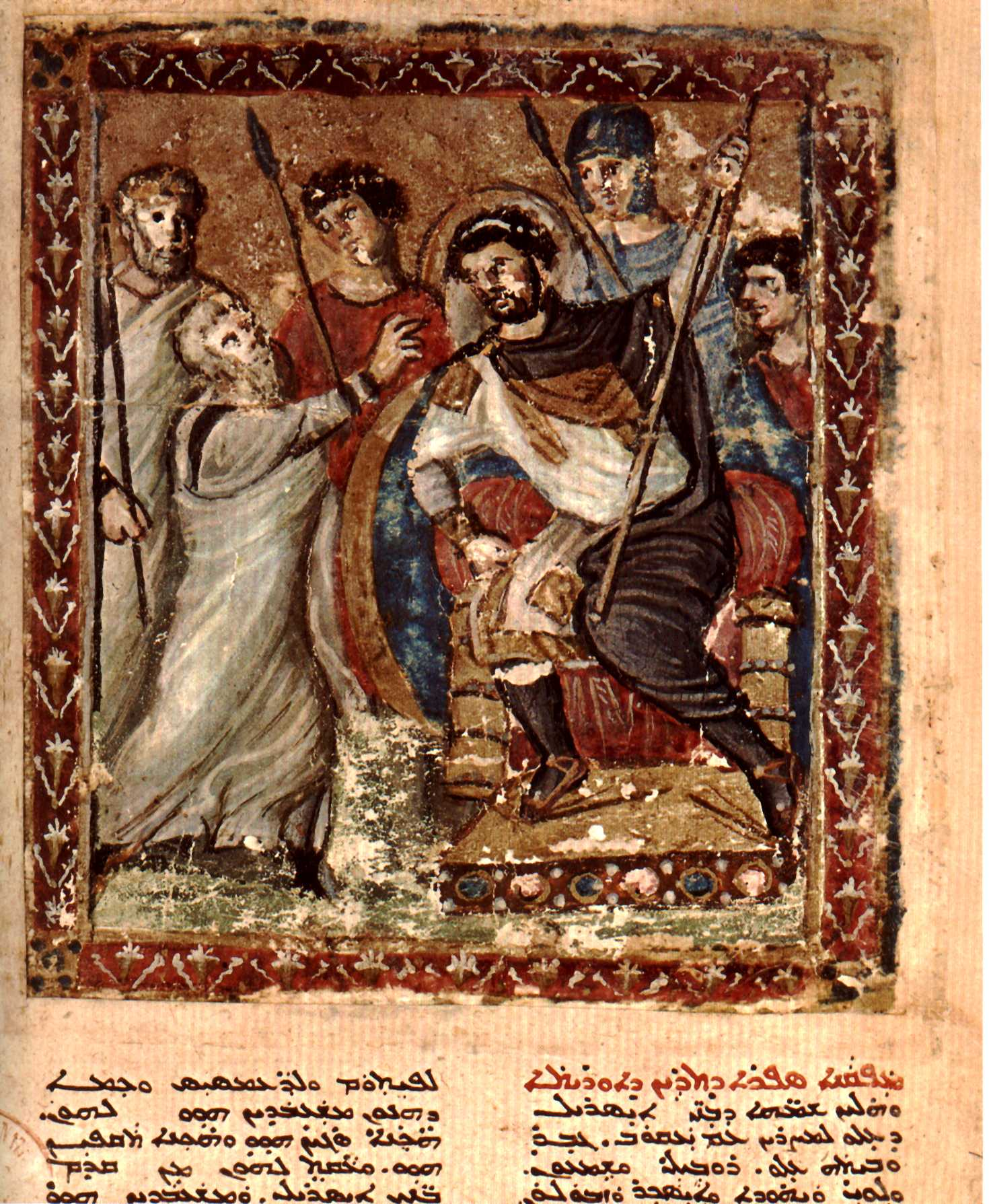
The Syriac Bible of Paris, Moses before pharaoh

Syriac is a dialect of Aramaic. Portions of the Old Testament were written in Aramaic and there are Aramaic phrases in the New Testament. Syriac translations of the New Testament were among the first and date from the 2nd century. The whole Bible was translated by the 5th century. Besides Syriac, there are Bible translations into other Aramaic dialects.

Syria played an important or even predominant role in the beginning of Christianity. Here is where the Gospel of Matthew, the Gospel of Luke, the Didache, Ignatiana, and the Gospel of Thomas are believed to have been written. Syria was the country in which the Greek language intersected with the Syriac, which was closely related to the Aramaic dialect used by Jesus and the Apostles. That is why Syriac versions are highly esteemed by textual critics.

Scholars have distinguished five or six different Syriac versions of all or part of the New Testament. It is possible that some translations have been lost. Other than Syria, the manuscripts also originate in countries like Egypt (specifically the Sinai), Iraq, Assyria, Armenia, Georgia, India, and even from China. This is good evidence for the great historical activity of the Syriac Church of the East.

== Diatessaron ==
This is the earliest translation of the gospels into Syriac. The earliest translation of any New Testament text from Greek seems to have been the Diatessaron, a harmony of the four canonical gospels (perhaps with a now lost fifth text) prepared about AD 170 by Tatian. Although no original text of the Diatessaron survives, its foremost witness is a prose commentary on it by Ephrem the Syrian. Although there are many so-called manuscript witnesses to the Diatessaron, they all differ, and, ultimately only witness to the enduring popularity of such harmonies. Rescensions appeared in later centuries as translation of originals. Many medieval European harmonies draw on the Codex Fuldensis, which was likely based on the Diatessaron.

== Old Syriac version ==
The Old Syriac version translation of the four gospels or Vetus Syra is preserved today in only four manuscripts, both with a large number of gaps.

The Curetonian Gospels consist of fragments of the four Gospels. The text was brought in 1842 from the Nitrian Desert in Egypt, and is now held in the British Library. These fragments were examined by William Cureton and edited by him in 1858. The manuscript is dated paleographically to the 5th century. It is called Curetonian Syriac, and is designated by Syr^{c}.

The second manuscript is a palimpsest discovered by Agnes Smith Lewis at Saint Catherine's Monastery in 1892 at Mount Sinai called the Syriac Sinaiticus, and designated by Syr^{s}. This version was known and cited by Ephrem the Syrian, It is a representative of the Western text-type.

Two additional manuscripts of the Old Syriac version of the gospels were published in 2016 by Sebastian Brock and in 2023 by Grigory Kessel, respectively.

These four manuscripts represent only the Gospels. The text of Acts and the Pauline Epistles has not survived to the present. It is known only from citations made by Eastern fathers. The text of Acts was reconstructed by Frederick Cornwallis Conybeare, and the text of the Pauline Epistles by J. Molitor. They used Ephrem's commentaries.

It's apparent from textual criticism to determine that the Diatessaron influenced, and was thus earlier than, the Old Syriac.

== Peshitta ==
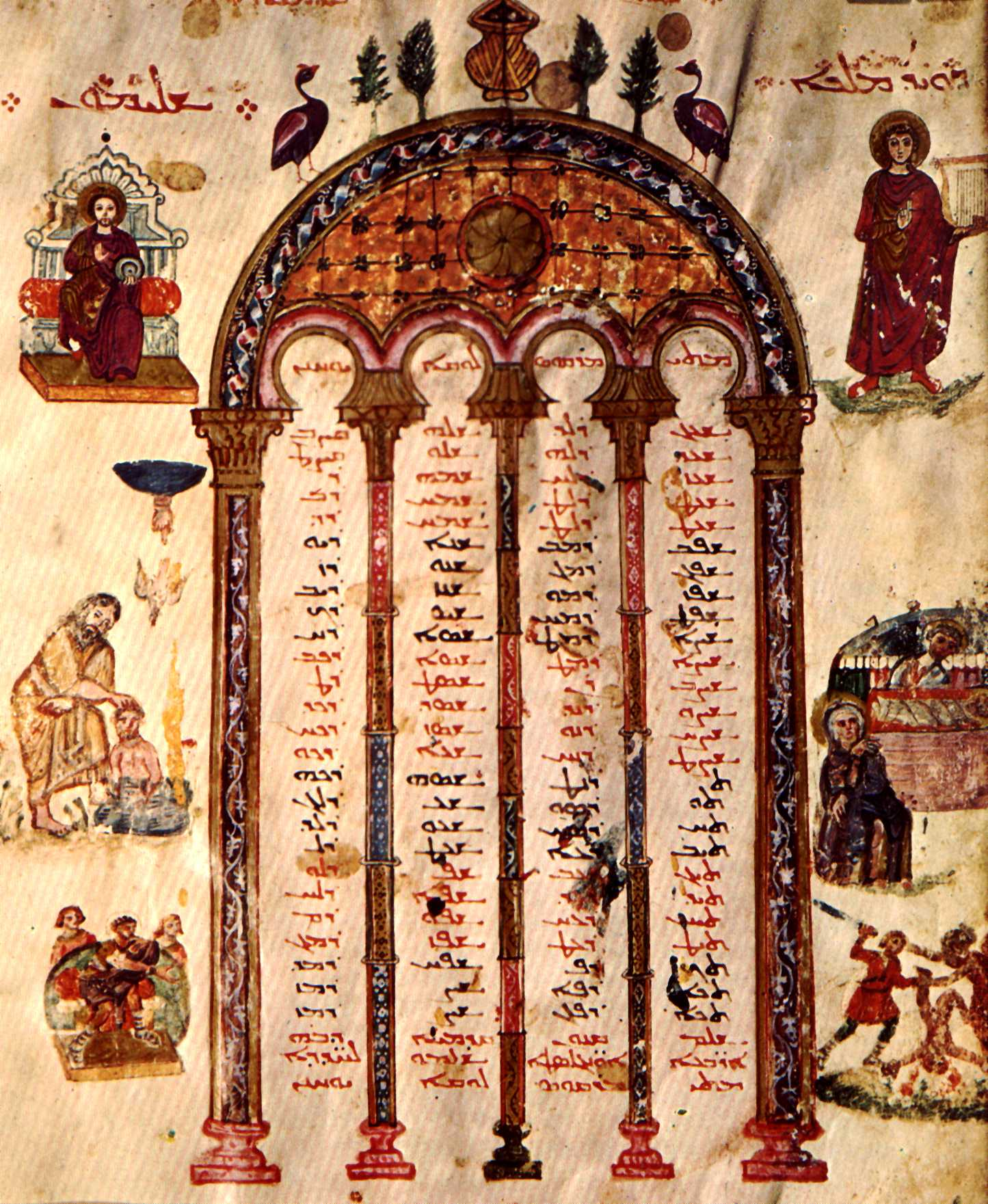
Rabbula Gospels, Eusebian Canons

The term Peshitta was used by Moses bar Kepha in 903 and means "simple" (in analogy to the Latin Vulgate). It is the oldest Syriac version which has survived to the present day in its entirety. It contains the entire Old Testament, most (?) of the deuterocanonical books, as well as 22 books of the New Testament, lacking the shorter Catholic Epistles (2-3 John, 2 Peter, Jude, as well as John 7:53-8:11) and Revelation. It was made in the beginning of the 5th century. Its authorship was ascribed to Rabbula, bishop of Edessa (411–435). The Syriac church still uses it to the present day.

More than 350 manuscripts survived, several of which date from the 5th and 6th centuries. In the Gospels it is closer to the Byzantine text-type, but in Acts to the Western text-type. It is designated by Syr^{p}.

The earliest manuscript of the Peshitta is a Pentateuch dated AD 464. There are two New Testament manuscripts of the 5th century (Codex Phillipps 1388).

Some manuscripts
British Library, Add. 14479 — the earliest dated Peshitta Apostolos.
British Library, Add. 14459 — the oldest dated Syriac manuscript of the two Gospels
British Library, Add. 14470 — the whole Peshitta text from the fifth/sixth century
British Library, Add. 14448 — the major part of Peshitta from the 699/700

== Later Syriac versions ==
The Philoxenian was probably produced in 508 for Philoxenus, Bishop of Mabbug in eastern Syria. This translation contains the five books not found in the Peshitta: 2 Peter, 2 John, 3 John, Jude, and the Apocalypse. This translation survived only in short fragments. It is designated by syr^{ph}.

The Harclean Syriac version of the Bible is designated by syr^{h}. It is represented by some 35 manuscripts dating from the 7th century and later; they show kinship with the Western text-type.

According to some scholars the Philoxenian and Harclensis are only recensions of Peshitta, but according to others they are independent new translations.

The Syro-Hexaplar version is the Syriac translation of the Septuagint based on the fifth column of Origen's Hexapla. The translation was made by Bishop Paul of Tella, around 617, from the Hexaplaric text of the Septuagint. The Syro-Hexaplar version is very obviously translated from Greek, keeping Greek phraseology in the Syriac. The Syrohexapla is given siglum Syh.

Several copies of a Palestinian Syriac version of the Bible have been found. It is not in the Syriac language; it is Aramaic written with the Syriac alphabet. Three long lectionaries with the four Gospels make up the bulk of the known Palestinian Syriac, although parts and fragments of the rest of the New Testament and the Old Testament have been found, as well. The lectionaries date from the 11th and 12th centuries, some of the fragments from centuries earlier, while the text is estimated to have been established between A.D. 300 and 600. The Palestinian Syriac (originally known as the Jerusalem Syriac) is given the siglum syr^{pal} and is thought to be connected to a group of Melchite Christians living in Palestine. Its connection to the older Syriac is unknown, but it is known to use a lot of Graecisms instead of the expected phraseology of the Christian Palestinian Aramaic dialect.

Two Palestinian Syriac codices were discovered in the same place as the Old Syriac version found by Agnes Smith Lewis in 1892; however, the Biblical texts of the palimpsests are much different and centuries apart. Lewis described her discovery years later, noting that it was from the "same box" as the much older Old Syriac version:

"[...] the Librarian, Father Galakteon, called my attention to a beautiful Codex whose value he was desirous of knowing. He kept [the Palestinian Syriac] apart from the others, wrapped in a cotton handkerchief, although it had come out of the same box as the now famous Palimpsest of the Syriac Gospels[...]"

== See also ==
- List of the Syriac New Testament manuscripts

Other early Eastern translations

- Coptic versions of the Bible
- Bible translations into Sogdian
- Bible translations into Nubian
- Bible translations into Persian

== Bibliography ==
- Kurt Aland; Barbara Aland (1995). The Text of the New Testament: An Introduction to the Critical Editions and to the Theory and Practice of Modern Textual Criticism. Grand Rapids, Michigan. ISBN 978-0-8028-4098-1.
- M. Black, K. Aland (1972). Die alten Übersetzungen des Neuen Testaments, die Kirchenväterzitate und Lektionare: der gegenwärtige Stand ihrer Erforschung und ihre Bedeutung für die griechische Textgeschichte. Berlin: Walter de Gruyter.
- Brock, Sebastian P. (1967). "Greek Words in the Syriac Gospels (Vet. and Pe.)". Le Muséon. 80: 389–426.
- Brock, Sebastian P. (2008). "The Use of the New Testament in the Writings of Mor Ephrem". Bringing Light to the World: Syriac Tradition Re-visited. Tiruvalla: Christava Sahitya Samithy. pp. 103–118.
- Bruce M. Metzger (1977). The Early Versions of the New Testament. Oxford: Clarendon Press. pp. 3–98. ISBN 0-19-826170-5.
- W. Wright, Catalogue of the Syriac Manuscripts in the British Museum, Gorgias Press LLC 2002.
- "The Syriac Version". Studia Biblica et Ecclesiastica. Oxford: 195–208. 1891.
- Syriac Versions of the Bible at the Bible Research
- At the Encyclopedia of Textual Criticism
- The New Testament with full western vocalization at syriacbible.nl
- Peshitta with analytical lexicon and English translation
