= Peshitta =

Standard Syriac Christian edition of the Bible

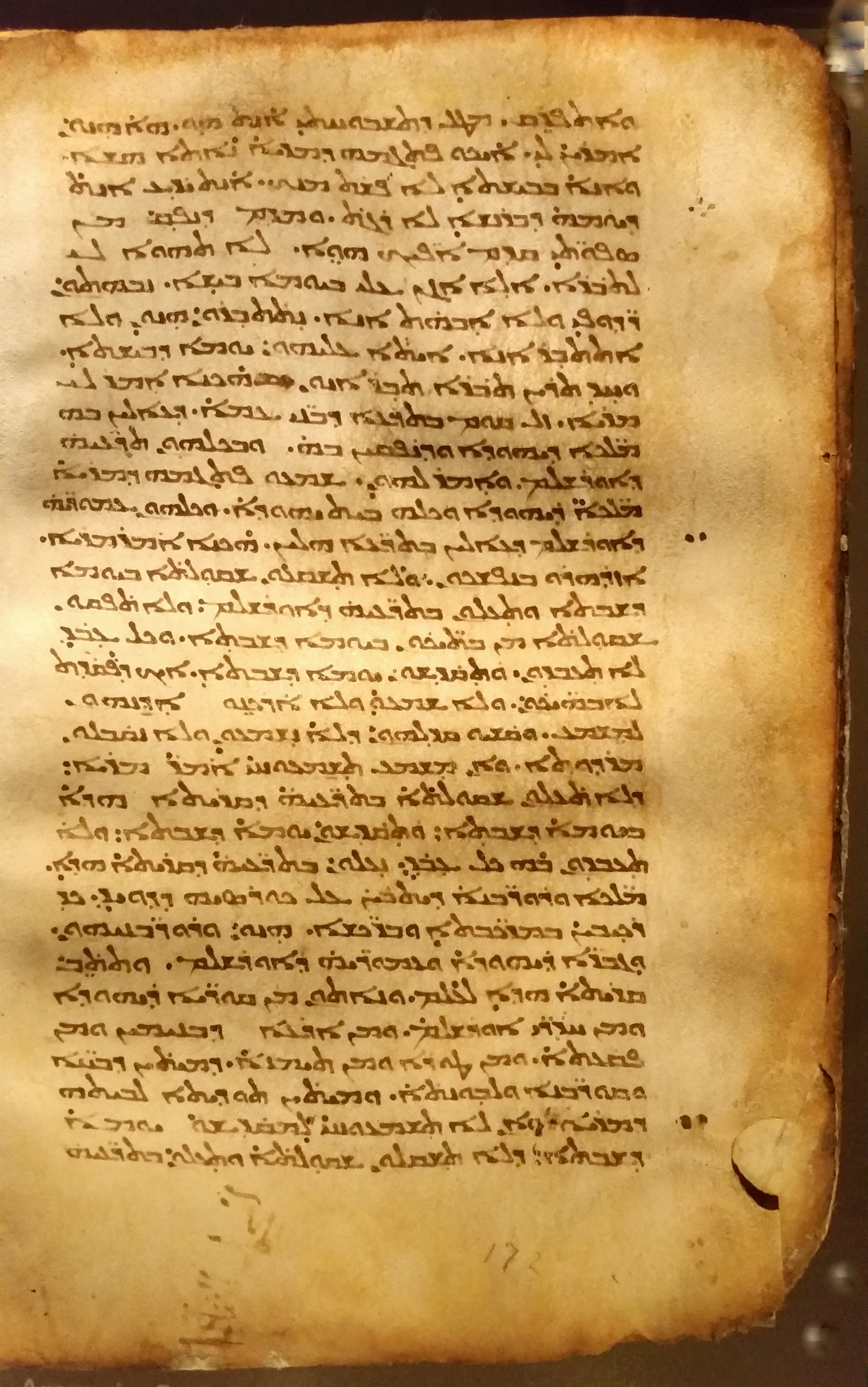
- 9th-century manuscript
- Full name: ܡܦܩܬܐ ܦܫܝܛܬܐ mappaqtâ pšîṭtâ
- Other names: Peshitta, Peshittâ, Pshitta, Pšittâ, Pshitto, Fshitto
- OT published: 2nd century
- NT published: 3rd-5th century
- Translation type: Syriac language
- Religious affiliation: Syriac Christianity
- Genesis 1:1–3 ܒܪܵܫܝܼܬܼ ܒ̣ܪܵܐ ܐܲܠܵܗܵܐ ܝܵܬ݂ ܫܡܲܝܵܐ ܘܝܵܬ݂ ܐܲܪܥܵܐ ܘܐܲܪܥܵܐ ܗ̣ܘܵܬ݂ ܬܘܿܗ ܘܒ݂ܘܿܗ ܘܚܸܫܘܿܟ݂ܵܐ ܥܲܠ ܐܲܦܲܝ̈ ܬܗܘܿܡܵܐ ܘܪܘܼܚܹܗ ܕܐܲܠܵܗܵܐ ܡܪܲܚܦܵܐ ܥܲܠ ܐܲܦܲܝ̈ ܡܲܝ̈ܵܐ ܘܐܸܡ̣ܲܪ݂ ܐܲܠܵܗܵܐ: ܢܸܗ̣ܘܸܐ ܢܘܼܗܪܵܐ ܘܲܗ̣ܘܵܐ ܢܘܼܗܪܵܐ John 3:16 ܗܵܟ݂ܲܢܵܐ ܓܹܝܪ ܐܲܚܸܒ݂ ܐܲܠܵܗܵܐ ܠܥܵܠܡܵܐ ܐܲܝܟܲܢܵܐ ܕܠܲܒ݂ܪܸܗ ܝܼܚܝܼܕ݂ܵܝܵܐ ܢܸܬܸܠ ܕܟ݂ܿܠ ܡ̇ܲܢ ܕܲܡܗܲܝܡܸܢ ܒܸܗ ܠܵܐ ܢܹܐܒ݂ܲܕ݂ ܐܸܠܵܐ ܢܸܗܘܘܼܢ ܠܸܗ ܚܲܝܹ̈ܐ ܕܲܠܥܵܠܲܡ

The Peshitta (Classical Syriac: ܦܫܺܝܛܬܳܐ or ܦܫܝܼܛܬܵܐ pšīṭta) is the standard Syriac edition of the Bible for the Syriac churches and traditions that follow the liturgy of the Syriac rites. It is considered one of the most well-known creations in Syriac literature.

The Peshitta is originally and traditionally written in the Classical Syriac dialect of the Aramaic language, although editions of the Peshitta can be translated and/or written in different languages.

The general consensus within Peshitta scholarship is that the Old Testament was translated into Syriac, largely from Hebrew with some supplementation from the Septuagint and Targums, by Jews (at least the Torah, Chronicles and Proverbs) and Jewish-Christians conversant with Jewish exegetical traditions, by or before the 2nd century CE, and the New Testament was translated from Koine Greek, probably in the early 5th century. This New Testament excludes certain books (2 Peter, 2 John, 3 John, Jude, Revelation) and had become standard by the early 5th century. The New Testament of the Peshitta often reflects the Byzantine text-type, although with some variations.

== Etymology ==
Peshitta is derived from the Syriac mappaqtâ pšîṭtâ (ܡܦܩܬܐ ܦܫܝܛܬܐ), literally meaning "simple version". However, it is also possible to translate pšîṭtâ as "common" (that is, for all people), or "straight", as well as the usual translation as "simple".

Syriac is a dialect, or group of dialects, of Eastern Aramaic, originating around Edessa, and is written in its own alphabet. This is transliterated into the Latin script in a number of ways, generating different spellings of the name: Peshitta, Peshittâ, Pshitta, Pšittâ, Pshitto, Fshitto. All of these are acceptable, but Peshitta is the most conventional spelling in English.

== History ==
The Peshitta had from the 5th century onward a wide circulation in Asia, and was accepted and honored by the whole diversity of sects of Syriac Christianity. It had a great missionary influence: the Armenian and Georgian versions, as well as the Arabic and the Persian, owe much to the Syriac. The Nestorian tablet of Chang'an shows the presence of the Syriac scriptures in China in the 8th century.

The Peshitta was first brought to Europe by Moses of Mardin, a noted Syrian ecclesiastic who unsuccessfully sought a patron for the work of printing it in Rome and Venice. However, he was successful in finding such a patron in the Imperial Chancellor of the Holy Roman Empire at Vienna in 1555—Albert Widmanstadt. He undertook the printing of the New Testament, and the emperor bore the cost of the special types which had to be cast for its issue in Syriac. Immanuel Tremellius, the converted Jew whose scholarship was so valuable to the English reformers and divines, made use of it, and in 1569 issued a Syriac New Testament in Hebrew script. In 1645, the editio princeps of the Old Testament was published by Gabriel Sionita for the Paris Polyglot, and in 1657 the whole Peshitta was included in Walton's London Polyglot. An edition of the Peshitta was that of John Leusden and Karl Schaaf, and it is still quoted under the symbol "Syrschaaf", or "SyrSch".

== New Testament ==
This Peshitta New Testament excluding certain books (2 Peter, 2 John, 3 John, Jude, Revelation) had become standard by the early 5th century. The five excluded books are present in the Harklean Version (616 CE) of Thomas of Harqel. The New Testament of the Peshitta often reflects the Byzantine text-type, although with some variations.

In a detailed examination of Matthew 1–14, George Gwilliam found that where texts differ, the Peshitta agrees with the Textus Receptus only 108 times and with the Codex Vaticanus 65 times. Meanwhile, in 137 instances it differs from both, usually with the support of the Old Syriac and the Old Latin, and in 31 instances it stands alone.

A statement by the Church Father Eusebius that Hegesippus "made some quotations from the Gospel according to the Hebrews and from the Syriac Gospel", means we should have a reference to a Syriac New Testament as early as 160–180 CE, the time of that Hebrew Christian writer. The translation of the New Testament has been admired by Syriac scholars, who have deemed it "careful, faithful, and literal" with it sometimes being referred to as the "Queen of the versions".

=== Critical edition of the New Testament ===
The standard United Bible Societies 1905 edition of the New Testament of the Peshitta was based on editions prepared by Syriacists Philip E. Pusey (d. 1880), Gwilliam (d. 1914) and John Gwynn. These editions comprised Gwilliam & Pusey's 1901 critical edition of the gospels, Gwilliam's critical edition of Acts, Gwilliam & Pinkerton's critical edition of Paul's Epistles and John Gwynn's critical edition of the General Epistles and later Revelation. This critical Peshitta text is based on a collation of more than seventy Peshitta and a few other Aramaic manuscripts. All 27 books of the common Western Canon of the New Testament are included in this British & Foreign Bible Society's 1905 Peshitta edition, as is the adultery pericope (John 7:53–8:11). The 1979 Syriac Bible, United Bible Society, uses the same text for its New Testament. The Online Bible reproduces the 1905 Syriac Peshitta NT in Hebrew characters.

== Translations ==
English

- John Wesley Etheridge – A Literal Translation of the Four Gospels From the Peschito, or Ancient Syriac and The Apostolical Acts and Epistles From the Peschito, or Ancient Syriac: To Which Are Added, the Remaining Epistles and The Book of Revelation, After a Later Syriac Text (1849).
- James Murdock – The New Testament, Or, The Book of the Holy Gospel of Our Lord and God, Jesus the Messiah (1851).
- George M. Lamsa – The Holy Bible From the Ancient Eastern Text (1933) – Contains both the Old and New Testaments according to the Peshitta text. This translation is better known as the Lamsa Bible. He also wrote several other books on the Peshitta and Aramaic primacy such as Gospel Light, New Testament Origin, and Idioms of the Bible, along with a New Testament commentary. To this end, several well-known Evangelical Protestant preachers have used or endorsed the Lamsa Bible, such as Oral Roberts, Billy Graham, and William M. Branham.
- Janet Magiera – Aramaic Peshitta New Testament Translation, Aramaic Peshitta New Testament Translation – Messianic Version, and Aramaic Peshitta New Testament Vertical Interlinear (in three volumes) (2006). Magiera is connected to George Lamsa.
- The Way International – Aramaic-English Interlinear New Testament
- William Norton – A Translation, in English Daily Used, of the Peshito-Syriac Text, and of the Received Greek Text, of Hebrews, James, 1 Peter, and 1 John: With An Introduction On the Peshito-Syriac Text, and the Received Greek Text of 1881 and A Translation in English Daily Used: of the Seventeen Letters Forming Part of the Peshito-Syriac Books. William Norton was a Peshitta primacist, as shown in the introduction to his translation of Hebrews, James, I Peter, and I John.
- Gorgias Press – Antioch Bible, a Peshitta text and translation of the Old Testament (including deuterocanon) and New Testament. 35 volumes.
- Andrew Gabriel Roth – Aramaic English New Testament (2008).
- Glenn David Bauscher – Aramaic-English Interlinear New Testament (2018)

Malayalam

- Andumalil Mani Kathanar – Vishudha Grantham. New Testament translation in Malayalam.
- Mathew Uppani C. M. I – Peshitta Bible. Translation (including Old and New Testaments) in Malayalam (1997).
- Arch-corepiscopos Curien Kaniamparambil – Vishudhagrandham. Translation (including Old and New Testaments) in Malayalam.

== Manuscripts ==
The inter-relationship between various significant ancient manuscripts of the Old Testament. LXX denotes the original Septuagint.

Although physical evidence has yet to be found, 18th-century Maronite Orientalist Giuseppe Assemani stated in his Bibliotheca Orientalis that a Syriac Gospel dated 78 CE was found in Mesopotamia.

The following manuscripts are in the British Archives:

- British Library, Add. 14470 – complete text of 22 books of the New Testament, from the 5th/6th-century
- Rabbula Gospels – a 6th-century illuminated Syriac Gospel Book
- Khaboris Codex – a 10th-century complete Peshitta New Testament
- Codex Phillipps 1388 – a Syriac manuscript on parchment containing text of the four Gospels dated Palaeographically to the 5th/6th centuries
- British Library, Add. 12140 – a 6th-century manuscript on parchment containing text from the four Gospels
- British Library, Add. 14479 – a 534 CE manuscript containing the 14 Pauline Epistles with some lacunae, dated by a colophon
- British Library, Add. 14455 – a 6th-century heavily damaged manuscript containing parts of the four Gospels
- British Library, Add. 14466 – a 10th/11th-century manuscript containing fragments of the gospels of Mark and Luke
- British Library, Add. 14467 – a 10th-century manuscript containing fragments of Matthew and John in Syriac and Arabic
- British Library, Add. 14669 – a 6th-century manuscript containing fragments of Luke and Mark.

== See also ==
- Bible translations into Aramaic
- Targum
