= De opificio mundi (John Philoponus) =

6th-century Hexaemeron

The De opificio mundi (On the Creation of the World) of John Philoponus was a 6th-century commentary on the Genesis creation narrative. The text is dated sometime between 546 and 560 AD. John, an advocate for Neoplatonism and a follower of the astronomy of Ptolemy, was interested in converging the six-day creation story with the philosophical theory of Aristotle and Plato from a Miaphysite point of view. He also wanted to integrate philosophical approaches with the more stringently literalistic interpretations of Basil of Caesarea.

John came to influence later works such as the Hexaemeron of Jacob of Edessa.

== Content ==
In the preface of the work, John explains how he came about to writing his Opificio. The work was dedicated to Sergius of Tella, then bishop, who would go on to become the Patriarch of Antioch. He also dedicated it to one of his pupils named Athanasius, the nephew of the empress Theodora. John says that others, especially Sergius, had been pressing him to write an account to refute the pagans in their criticisms of the Book of Genesis, and so defend the Mosaic account of creation, and to refute their belief in the eternity of the world. He sided with the exegetical school known as the School of Alexandria which had also been coming under intellectual pressure from some critics at that time. The name John chose for his work was the same name as the earlier De opificio mundi written by the Jewish philosopher and also advocate of the Alexandrian school of exegesis, Philo of Alexandria. Philo had criticized those searching for scientific information in the scriptures as 'sophists of literalism'. Likewise, the primary fellow Christian that John sought to challenge was also one such literalist, Cosmas Indicopleustes especially as pronounced in his famous work known as the Christian Topography (composed c. 550). Beginning his commentary, John argued that the purpose of Genesis was not to impart a scientific cosmogony but instead to correct the superstitious Egyptians that worshiped the sun, moon, and stars. John sought to explore conceptual scenarios through the use of thought experiments (hypotheses). One of the main modes of thought he sought to criticize in this manner was astrology and the idea that the luminaries were divine beings who moved of their own volition and through their movements influenced worldly affairs. Contrary to this idea, John proposed to explain the movement of the luminaries through an original impetus imparted onto them by God during the creation period and repudiated the notion that the luminaries were divine beings or had any form of astrological influence on the world. For his work on the impetus concept, he is often credited with being the first individual to present a unified theory of dynamics.

The second book of the Opificio is an explanation of Genesis 1:2–5 and the first day of creation. The third book is about Genesis 1:6–8, concerning the firmament and the second day of creation. Here, he advocates for the sphericity of the Earth to refute the position of Cosmas. Like Basil of Caesarea's Hexaemeron, John's work explained that the spherical Earth was contained in a spherical heaven. This he says goes against the uneducated Dyophysite "scriptural fundamentalists" (flat Earthers) like Cosmas who were uneducated in the scriptures and appear in folly before the pagans.

Like Augustine, John favored the view that creation was instantaneous and not that it occurred over six literal days. According to John, the creation days do not correspond to normal chronological days, since the agents for the measurement of time were only created on the fourth day (the sun, moon, and stars), and yet days, mornings, and evenings were the terms used as chronological delimiters for the creation acts before that. John sought for a more symbolic meaning of the "six" days, and considered many ways in which that might be so: it might have been that the number six was chosen because it corresponds to a combination of the single dimensions of a line or that it corresponds to a sixfold hierarchy of entities emerging from formless matter. These were meanings that were not historical but reflective of metaphysical truthes.

John also argued on the basis of Genesis 2:7 that human souls are distinguished from animal souls.

== Editions and translations ==
- Philoponus, Ioannes. 1897. De opificio mundi libri VII, ed. Gualterius Reichert. Leipzig: Teubner.
- Clemens Scholten (ed), De Opificio Mundi = Über die Erschaffung der Welt. Fontes Christiania 23. 3 vols. Freiburg: Herder. [Greek text and German translation]

== See also ==
- Jacob of Serugh
