= Hexaemeron (Jacob of Edessa) =

Commentary on the six days of creation ca. 700

The Hexaemeron of Jacob of Edessa (d. 708) is a work of Syriac literature and is Jacob's commentary on the six days of creation of the Genesis creation narrative. Jacob worked on it in the first few years of the eighth century, as it was his final work. Unable to complete it within his own lifetime, the work was finished by his friend George, Bishop of the Arabs (d. 724). It is an example of a work in the genre of Hexaemeral literature, but should not be confused with a similar earlier work, namely the Hexaemeron by Jacob of Serugh.

== Context ==
Jacob of Edessa wrote several other commentaries (though his Hexaemeron's attempt to incorporate large amounts of scientific and philosophical knowledge have led some to question whether it is aptly called a 'commentary) including others that covered Genesis, such as his Commentary on the Octateuch. Jacob followed Basil of Caesarea in the tradition of the Antiochene school of exegesis, including Basil's own Hexaemeron, whose exegetical similarities with Jacob's work have been studied. In addition, it has been shown that Jacob made extensive use of Aristotle's theory of the four elements. Some have speculated that the work may be further contextualized into Jacob's wish to reassert the role of the Christian God in the creation of the cosmos and the reliability of the Genesis creation narrative in light of the Arab conquests.

The sources for Jacob's biblical citations are composed of a mixture stemming from the Septuagint, the Peshitta, and the Syro-Hexaplar version. Though Jacob had also completed a translation of the Bible by 705, his biblical citation were not made by copying over from it. The Peshitta (Syriac translation of the Bible) was the primary one, although there is evidence for his use of a Greek-language and, to a lesser extent, the Syro-Hexapla. Some uses of the text also reflect Jacob's own editorial or stylistic choice or his working from memory of the text.

== Content ==
One point of dispute that Jacob discussed was that of the upper waters described in Genesis. Influenced by Hellenistic philosophy, Christians such as Origen and Gregory of Nyssa rejected the traditional belief in a physical body of water above the firmament, and instead reinterpreted the upper waters as the noetic world according to a Platonic cosmological scheme. However, both he and Basil of Caesarea returned to and reaffirmed a belief in the literal waters. Jacob, however, sought to reconcile this with Aristotle's view of concentric circles, which asserted that the further out one goes, the lighter the elements that they encounter, such that water should not be further out than the air. For Basil, this was resolved by pointing to the firmament as a solid body that the waters could rest upon, preventing their descent. Jacob however followed John Philoponus who criticized of Basil's view in his De opificio mundi, and instead posited that the upper waters were in fact a mixture of water and air that were lighter than the compact air that they surrounded. In turn, above the upper waters was posited a lighter substance that was composed of a mixture of fire and air. In this respect, John also believed that terms like "water", "firmament", and "heavens" were ambiguous in the creation narrative and sought to interpret them through meteorological processes: here too Jacob followed John. Likely through the intermediary of Jacob's works, John's ideas came to have a wider influence.

Jacob's detailed analysis of the nature and hierarchy of the succeeding spheres was greatly influenced by the Carmina Arcana of Gregory of Nazianzus. The sun has some similarities to God, insofar as it reaches out into the cosmos, and it symbolizes God's absolute remoteness. Against conventional viewpoints, Jacob posited that the sun (and not Saturn, which was the most distant-planet that humans had known about until the discovery of Uranus in 1781) was the most distant luminary, though he was not the first to do so as this position was also held by Anaxagoras and considered by Ptolemy. Though he went against Ptolemaic cosmology in this respect, he still agreed with the movements of the luminaries that it posited. The cosmos itself symbolizes a higher reality. There are three levels or ranks of beings: God, then angels, then men. The highest of these is the purest, and the lowest is the most base. Jacob discusses the weight and quality of the elements as well as their composition, such as if they are pure or compounded. For example, both the sun and the stars are simple and pure. The moon is compounded (of the four elements) and is the lowest luminary. Whereas the sun is life-giving and transmits light, the stars and the moon both receive light. The stars unlike the sun do not have their own light as they are made of air and not fire. In fact, fire has a superior simplicity and purity than does air. The heaviest of the four elements is earth, which is why it is located in the center of the cosmos. Because lighter objects are located closer towards the center, and the moon is the lowest luminary, the moon is also the heaviest of the luminaries.

Jacob's repositioning of the sun also related to his rejection of astrology. The pre-eminence of the position of the sun corresponded with its control over the movements of the stars. And because the movements of the stars were themselves controlled, the stars in turn were not capable of governing or controlling the affairs of the Earth. The stars were not divine, rational, or anything of the sort. The sun itself does not have its own movement but is controlled ultimately by God. An earlier Syriac author, Jacob of Serugh, also took interest in refuting astrology in his own Hexaemeron.

Jacob wrote extensively on the creation and nature of angels, to the degree that it far exceeded the length dedicated to the subject in other Hexameral works. The sources he engaged with in these conversations in the most detail was the Poemata Arcana by Gregory of Nazianzus, and the Celestial Hierarchy of Pseudo-Dionysius the Areopagite.

== Editions and translations ==
There are two critical editions of Jacob of Edessa's Hexaemeron, both of which are based on a 9th-century manuscript from Lyon:

- Chabot, J.B. 1928. Iacobi Edesseni Hexaemeron, seu in opus creationis libri septem, Paris (CSCO 92; Script. Syr. 44).
- Çiçek, J. Y. (ed.) 2010. Jacob of Edessa: Hexaemeron, Piscataway.

A French translation exists:

- Martin, J.P.P. 1888. "L’Hexaméron de Jacques d’Édesse," Journal asiatique 8,11: 155–219, 401–90.

Although no full-length English translation exists, a partial one has been produced:

- Greatrex, Marina. 2000. Memre I, II and IV of the Hexaemeron of Jacob of Edessa. A Translation and Introduction (Doctoral dissertation, University of Cardiff).

Finally, there is one translation into Latin:

- Vaschalde, A. 1932. Iacobi Edesseni Hexaemeron, Leuven (CSCO 97; Script Syr. 48).

== See also ==
- De opificio mundi
