= Biblical cosmology =

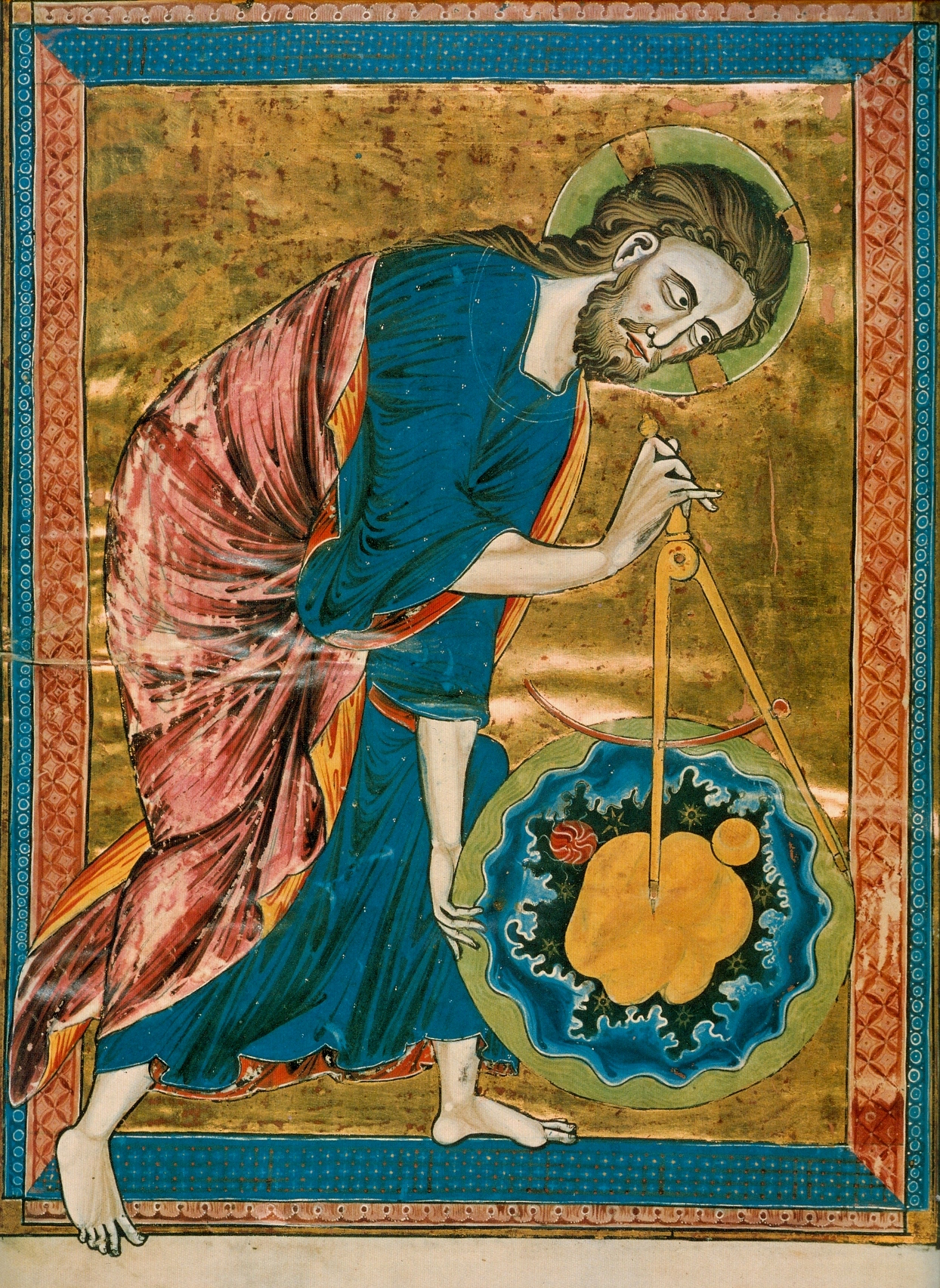
God creating the cosmos (Bible moralisée, French, 13th century)

Biblical cosmology is the biblical writers' conception of the cosmos as an organised, structured entity, including its origin, order, meaning and destiny. The Bible was formed over many centuries, involving many authors, and reflects shifting patterns of religious belief; consequently, its cosmology is not always consistent. Nor do the biblical texts necessarily represent the beliefs of all Jews or Christians at the time they were put into writing: the majority of the texts making up the Hebrew Bible or Old Testament in particular represent the beliefs of only a small segment of the ancient Israelite community, the members of a late Judean religious tradition centered in Jerusalem and devoted to the exclusive worship of Yahweh.

The ancient Israelites envisaged the universe as a flat disc-shaped Earth floating on water, heaven above, underworld below. Humans inhabited Earth during life and the underworld after death; there was no way that mortals could enter heaven, and the underworld was morally neutral; only in Hellenistic times (after c. 330 BCE) did Jews begin to adopt the Greek idea that it would be a place of punishment for misdeeds, and that the righteous would enjoy an afterlife in heaven. In this period too the older three-level cosmology in large measure gave way to the Greek concept of a spherical Earth suspended in space at the center of a number of concentric heavens.

The opening words of the Genesis creation narrative (Genesis 1:1–2:3) sum up the biblical editors' view of how the cosmos originated: "In the beginning God created the heavens and the earth"; Yahweh, the God of Israel, was solely responsible for creation and had no rivals, implying Israel's superiority over all other nations. Later Jewish thinkers, adopting ideas from Greek philosophy, concluded that God's Wisdom, Word and Spirit penetrated all things and gave them unity. Christian traditions then adopted these ideas and identified Jesus with the Logos (Word): "In the beginning was the Word, and the Word was with God, and the Word was God" (John 1:1). Interpreting and producing expositions of biblical cosmology was formalized into a genre of writing among Christians and Jews called the Hexaemal literature. The genre entered into vogue in the second half of the fourth century, after it was introduced into Christian circles by the Hexaemeron of Basil of Caesarea.

== Cosmogony (origins of the cosmos) ==
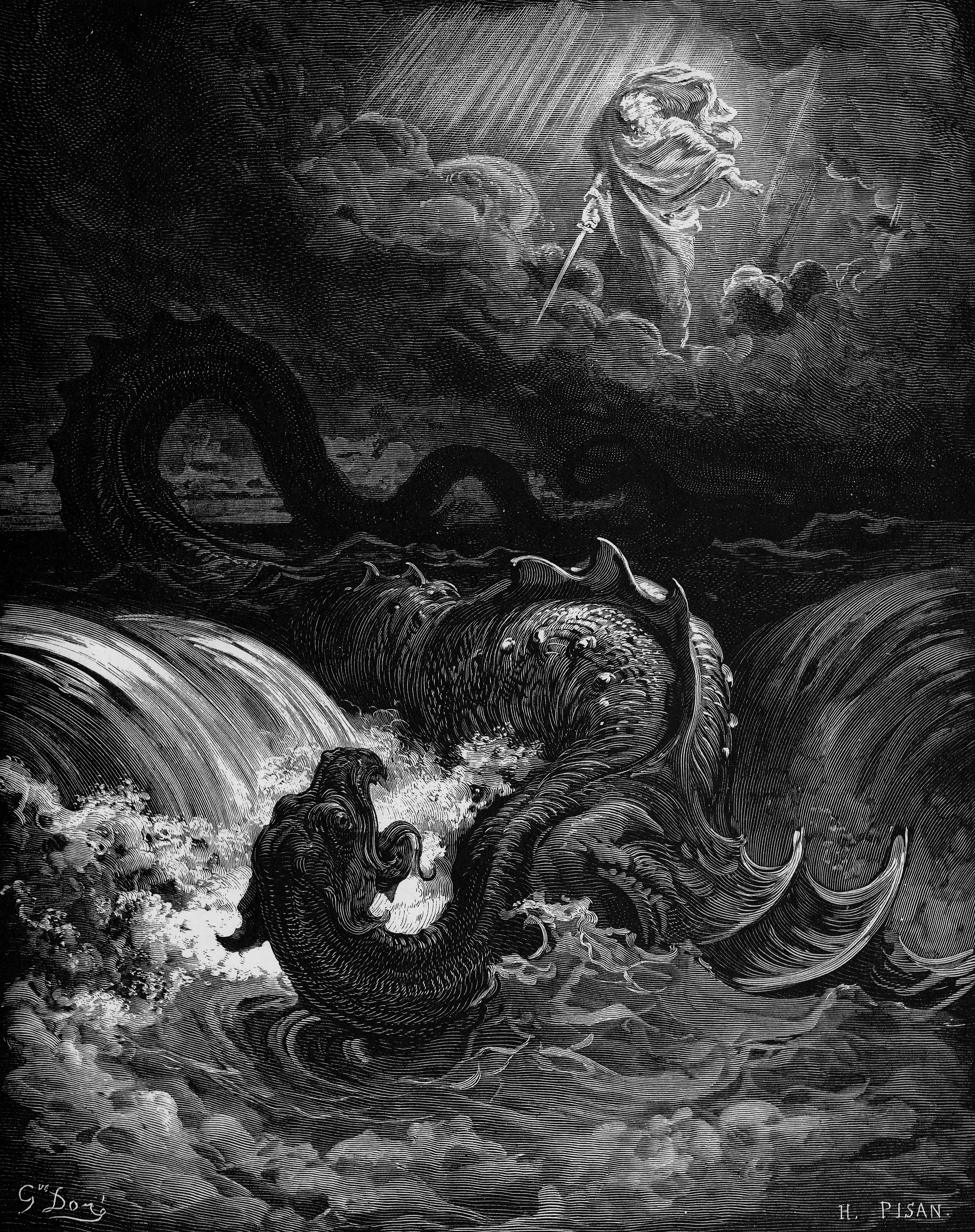
The Destruction of Leviathan (Gustave Doré, 1865)

=== Divine battle and divine speech ===
Two different models of the process of creation existed in ancient Israel. In the "logos" (speech) model, God speaks and shapes unresisting dormant matter into effective existence and order (Psalm 33: "By the word of YHWH the heavens were made, and by the breath of his mouth all their hosts; he gathers up the waters like a mound, stores the Deep in vaults"); in the second, or "agon" (struggle) model, God does battle with the monsters of the sea at the beginning of the world in order to mark his sovereignty and power. Psalm 74 evokes the agon model: it opens with a lament over God's desertion of his people and their tribulations, then asks him to remember his past deeds: "You it was who smashed Sea with your might, who battered the heads of the monsters in the waters; You it was who crushed the heads of Leviathan, who left them for food for the denizens of the desert..." In this world-view the seas are primordial forces of disorder, and the work of creation is preceded by a divine combat (or "theomachy").

Creation in the "agon" model takes the following storyline: (1) God as the divine warrior battles the monsters of chaos, who include Sea, Death, Tannin and Leviathan; (2) The world of nature joins in the battle and the chaos-monsters are defeated; (3) God is enthroned on a divine mountain, surrounded by lesser deities; (4) He speaks, and nature brings forth the created world, or for the Greeks, the cosmos. This myth was taken up in later Jewish and Christian apocalyptic literature and projected into the future, so that the cosmic battle becomes the decisive act at the end of the world's history: thus the Book of Revelation (end of the 1st century CE) tells how, after the God's final victory over the sea-monsters, New Heavens and New Earth shall be inaugurated in a cosmos in which there will be "no more sea" (Revelation 21:1).

The Genesis creation narrative (Genesis 1:1–2:3) is the quintessential "logos" creation myth. Like the "agon" model it begins with darkness and the uncreated primordial ocean: God separates and restrains the waters, but he does not create them from nothing. God initiates each creative act with a spoken word ("God said, Let there be..."), and finalises it with the giving of a name. Creation by speech is not unique to the Old Testament: it is prominent in some Egyptian traditions. There is, however, a difference between the Egyptian and Hebrew logos mythologies: in Genesis 1 the divine word of the Elohim (God) is an act of "making into" emphasizing a sovereign imposition of structure; the word of Egyptian creator-god, by contrast, is an almost magical "activation" of something inherent in pre-creation (chaos) awakening its innate potential: as such, it goes beyond the concept of fiat (divine act) to something more like the Logos of the Gospel of John.

=== Naming: God, Wisdom, Torah and Christ ===
According to John H. Walton, in the ancient Near-East things did not exist until they were named: "The name of a living being or an object was ... the very essence of what was defined, and the pronouncing of a name was to create what was spoken." The pre-exilic (before 586 BCE) Old Testament allowed no equals to Yahweh in heaven, despite the continued existence of an assembly of subordinate servant-deities who helped make decisions about matters on heaven and earth. The post-exilic writers of the Wisdom tradition (e.g. the Book of Proverbs, Song of Songs, etc.) develop the idea that Wisdom, later identified with Torah, existed before creation and was used by God to create the universe: "Present from the beginning, Wisdom assumes the role of master builder while God establishes the heavens, restricts the chaotic waters, and shapes the mountains and fields." Adopting the language conventions from Greek philosophers who held that reason bound the universe together, the Wisdom tradition taught that God's Wisdom, Word and Spirit were the ground of cosmic unity. Christianity in turn adopted these ideas and applied them to Jesus Christ: the Epistle to the Colossians, commonly attributed to the Apostle Paul, calls Jesus "...the image of the invisible God, first-born of all creation...", and the Gospel of John also identifies him with the creative word ("In the beginning was the Word, and the Word was with God, and the Word was God").

== Cosmography (shape and structure of the cosmos) ==
The Old Testament cosmos.

=== Heavens, Earth, and underworld ===
The Hebrew Bible depicted a three-part world, with the heavens (shamayim) above, Earth (eres) in the middle, and the underworld (sheol) below. After the 4th century BCE this was gradually replaced by a Greek scientific cosmology of a spherical Earth surrounded by multiple concentric heavens.

=== The cosmic ocean ===
The three-part world of heavens, Earth and underworld floated in Tehom, the mythological cosmic ocean, which covered the Earth until God created the firmament to divide it into upper and lower portions and reveal the dry land; the world has been protected from the cosmic ocean ever since by the solid dome of the firmament.

The tehom is, or was, hostile to God: it confronted him at the beginning of the world (Psalm 104:6ff) but fled from the dry land at his rebuke; he has now set a boundary or bar for it which it cannot pass (Jeremiah 5:22 and Job 38:8–10). The cosmic sea is the home of monsters which God conquers: "By his power he stilled the sea, by his understanding he smote Rahab!" (Job 26:12f). (Rahab is an exclusively Hebrew sea-monster; others, including Leviathan and the tannin, or dragons, are found in Ugaritic texts; it is not entirely clear whether they are identical with Sea or are Sea's helpers). The "bronze sea" which stood in the forecourt of the Temple in Jerusalem probably corresponds to the "sea" in Babylonian temples, representing the apsu, the cosmic ocean.

In the New Testament Jesus' conquest of the stormy sea shows the conquering deity overwhelming the forces of chaos: a mere word of command from the Son of God stills the foe (Mark 4:35–41), who then tramples over his enemy, (Jesus walking on water - Mark 6:45, 6:47–51). In Revelation, where the Archangel Michael expels the dragon (Satan) from heaven ("And war broke out in heaven, with Michael and his angels attacking the dragon..." – Revelation 12:7), the motif can be traced back to Leviathan in Israel and to Tiamat, the chaos-ocean, in Babylonian myth, identified with Satan via an interpretation of the serpent in Eden.

=== Heavens ===
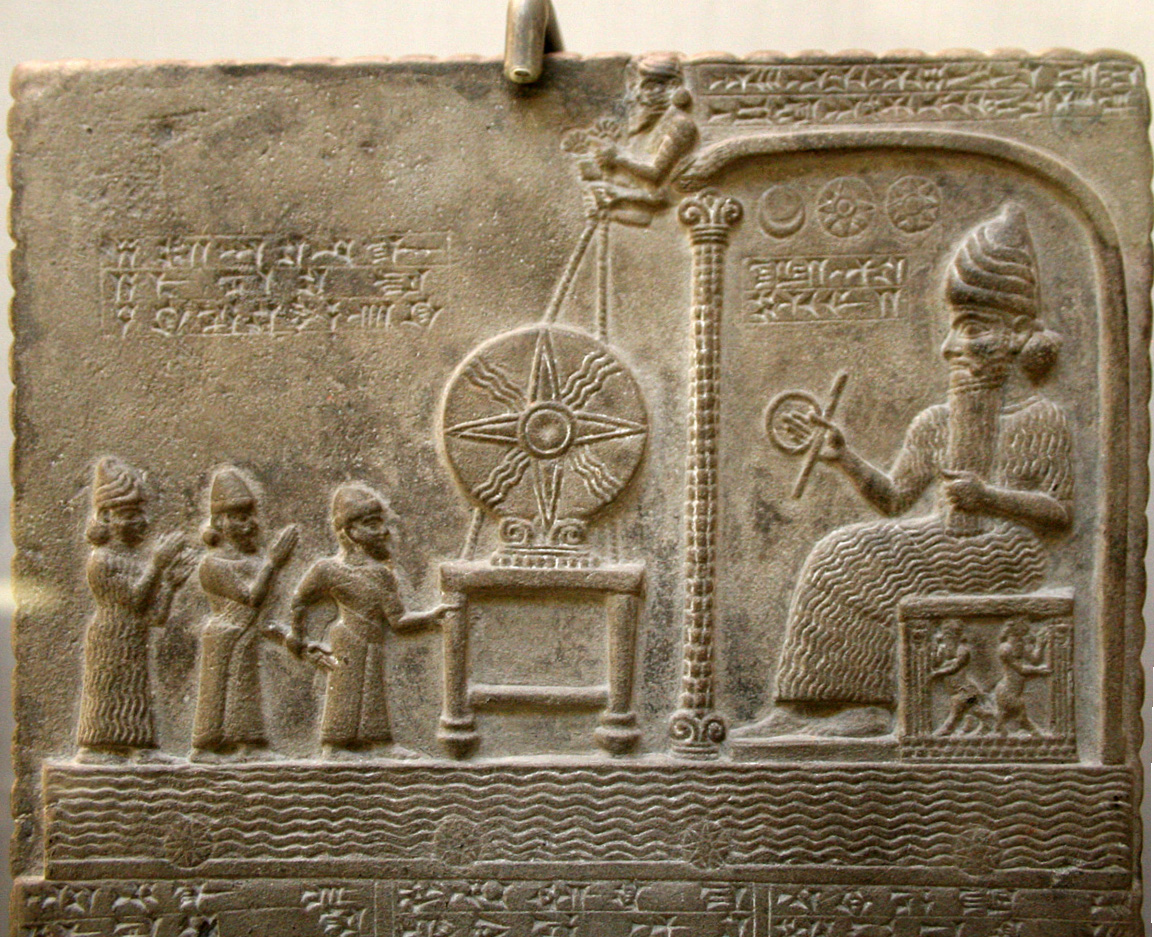
The Tablet of Shamash depicting a scene in heaven, with celestial waters below, supported by a solid base, with four stars.

==== Form and structure ====
In the Old Testament the word shamayim represented both the sky/atmosphere, and the dwelling place of God. The raqia or firmament – the visible sky – was a solid inverted bowl over the Earth, coloured blue from the heavenly ocean above it. Rain, snow, wind and hail were kept in storehouses outside the raqia, which had "windows" to allow them in – the waters for Noah's flood entered when the "windows of heaven" were opened. Heaven extended down to and was coterminous with (i.e. it touched) the farthest edges of the Earth (e.g. Deuteronomy 4:32); humans looking up from Earth saw the floor of heaven, which they saw also as God's throne, as made of clear blue lapis lazuli (Exodus 24:9–10), and (Ezekiel 1:26). Below that was a layer of water, the source of rain, which was separated from us by an impenetrable barrier, the firmament (Genesis 1:6–8). The rain may also be stored in heavenly cisterns (Job 38:37) or storehouses (Deut 28:12) alongside the storehouses for wind, hail and snow.

Grammatically the word shamayim can be either dual (two) or plural (more than two), without ruling out the singular (one). As a result, it is not clear whether there were one, two, or more heavens in the Old Testament, but most likely there was only one, and phrases such as "heaven of heavens" were meant to stress the vastness of God's realm.

The Babylonians had a more complex idea of heaven, and during the Babylonian exile (6th century BCE) the influence of Babylonian cosmology led to the idea of a plurality of heavens among Jews. This continued into the New Testament: Revelation apparently has only one heaven, but the Epistle to the Hebrews and the epistles to the Colossians and the Ephesians have more than one, although they don't specify how many, and the apostle Paul tells of his visit to the third heaven (2 Corinthians 12:2–4), the place, according to contemporary thought, where the garden of Paradise is to be found. The reference to the "third heaven" may refer to one of two cosmological systems present in antiquity: one where the cosmos was divided into seven heavens, and the other where the cosmos was divided into three.

==== God and the heavenly beings ====
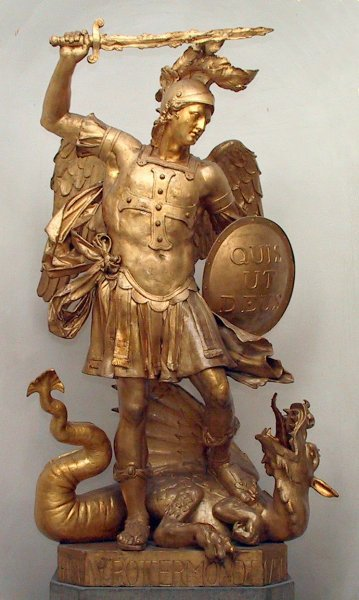
The Archangel Michael, a member of the host of divine beings who attend God in heaven, defeating Satan, the dragon of chaos.

Israel and Judah, like other Canaanite kingdoms, originally had a full pantheon of gods. The chief of the old Canaanite pantheon was the god El, but over time Yahweh replaced him as the national god and the two merged. The remaining gods were now subject to Yahweh: "Who in the sky is comparable to Yahweh, like Yahweh among the divine beings? A god dreaded in the Council of holy beings...?" (Psalm 89:6–9). In the Book of Job the Council of Heaven, the Sons of God (bene elohim) meet in heaven to review events on Earth and decide the fate of Job. One of their number is "the Satan", literally "the accuser", who travels over the Earth much like a Persian imperial spy, (Job dates from the period of the Persian empire), reporting on, and testing, the loyalty of men to God.

Belief in the divinity of the heavenly bodies explains a passage in Joshua 10:12, usually translated as Joshua asking the Sun and Moon to stand still, but in fact Joshua utters an incantation to ensure that the sun-god and moon-god, who supported his enemies, would not provide them with oracles.

In the earlier Old Testament texts the bene elohim were gods, but subsequently they became angels, the "messengers" (malakim), whom Jacob sees going up and down a "ladder" (actually a celestial mountain) between heaven and Earth. In earlier works the messengers were anonymous, but in the Second Temple period (539 BCE–100 CE) they began to be given names, and eventually became the vast angelic orders of Christianity and Judaism. Thus the gods and goddesses who had once been the superiors or equals of Yahweh were first made his peers, then subordinate gods, and finally ended as angels in his service.

==== Paradise and the human soul ====
There is no concept of a human soul, or of eternal life, in the oldest parts of the Old Testament. Death is the going-out of the breath which God once breathed into the dust, all men face the same fate in Sheol, a shadowy existence without knowledge or feeling (Job 14:13; Qoheloth 9:5), and there is no way that mortals can enter heaven. In the centuries after the Babylonian exile, a belief in afterlife and post-death retribution appeared in Jewish apocalyptic literature. At much the same time the Bible was translated into Greek, and the translators used the Greek word paradaisos (Paradise) for the garden of God and Paradise came to be located in heaven.

=== Earth ===
==== Cosmic geography ====
In the Old Testament period, the Earth was most commonly thought of as a flat disc floating on water. The concept was apparently quite similar to that depicted in a Babylonian world-map from about 600 BCE: a single circular continent bounded by a circular sea, and beyond the sea a number of equally spaced triangles called nagu, "distant regions", apparently islands although possibly mountains. The Old Testament likewise locates islands alongside the Earth; (Psalm 97:1) these are the "ends of the earth" according to Isaiah 41:5, the extreme edge of Job's circular horizon (Job 26:10) where the vault of heaven is supported on mountains. Other OT passages suggest that the sky rests on pillars (Psalm 75:3, 1 Samuel 2:8, Job 9:6), on foundations (Psalms 18:7 and 82:5), or on "supports" (Psalm 104:5). The Book of Job imagines the cosmos as a vast tent, with the Earth as its floor and the sky as the tent itself; from the edges of the sky God hangs the Earth over "nothing", meaning the vast Ocean, securely supported by being tied to the sky (Job 26:7). If the technical means by which Yahweh keeps the earth from sinking into the chaos-waters are unclear, it is nevertheless clear that he does so by virtue of his personal power.

New Testament scholar Ronald L. Farmer believes the author of Revelation assumed a flat Earth in Revelation 7:1. Hebrew Bible scholar Dr. Kyle Greenwood believes that "the phrase 'four corners of the earth' seems to have been an idiom related to the four cardinal directions, which encompassed the totality of earth's surface." The idea that the Earth was a sphere was developed by the Greeks in the 6th century BCE, and by the 3rd century BCE this was generally accepted by educated Romans and Greeks and even by some Jews.

==== Temples, mountains, gardens and rivers ====
In the cosmology of the ancient Near East, the cosmic warrior-god, after defeating the powers of chaos, would create the world and build his earthly house, the temple. Just as the abyss, the deepest deep, was the place for Chaos and Death, so God's temple belonged on the high mountain. In ancient Judah the mountain and the location of the Temple was Zion (Jerusalem), the navel and center of the world (Ezekiel 5:5 and Ezekiel 38:12). The Psalms describe God sitting enthroned over the Flood (the cosmic sea) in his heavenly palace (Psalm 29:10), the eternal king who "lays the beams of his upper chambers in the waters" (Psalm 104:3). The Samaritan Pentateuch identifies this mountain as Mount Gerizim, which the New Testament also implicitly acknowledges (John 4:20). This imagery recalls the Mesopotamian god Ea who places his throne in Apsu, the primeval fresh waters beneath the Earth, and the Canaanite god El, described in the Baal cycle as having his palace on a cosmic mountain which is the source of the primordial ocean/water springs.

The point where heavenly and earthly realms join is depicted as an earthly "garden of God", associated with the temple and royal palace. Ezekiel 28:12–19 places the garden in Eden on the mountain of the gods; in Genesis 2–3 Eden's location is more vague, simply far away "in the east", but there is a strong suggestion in both that the garden is attached to a temple or palace. In Jerusalem the earthly Temple was decorated with motifs of the cosmos and the Garden, and, like other ancient near eastern temples, its three sections made up a symbolic microcosm, from the outer court (the visible world of land and sea), through the Holy Place (the visible heaven and the garden of God) to the Holy of Holies (the invisible heaven of God). The imagery of the cosmic mountain and garden of Ezekiel reappears in the New Testament Book of Revelation, applied to the messianic Jerusalem, its walls adorned with precious stones, the "river of the water of life" flowing from under its throne (Revelation 22:1–2).

A stream from underground (or a subterranean ocean of fresh water) fertilises Eden before dividing into four rivers that go out to the entire earth (Genesis 2:5–6); in Ezekiel 47:1–12 (see Ezekiel's Temple) and other prophets the stream issues from the Temple itself, makes the desert bloom, and turns the Dead Sea from salt to fresh. Yet the underground waters are ambiguous: they are the source of life-giving rivers, but they are also associated with death (Jeremiah 2:6 and Job 38:16–17 describe how the way to Sheol is through water, and its gates are located at the foot of the mountain at the bottom of the seas).

=== Underworld ===
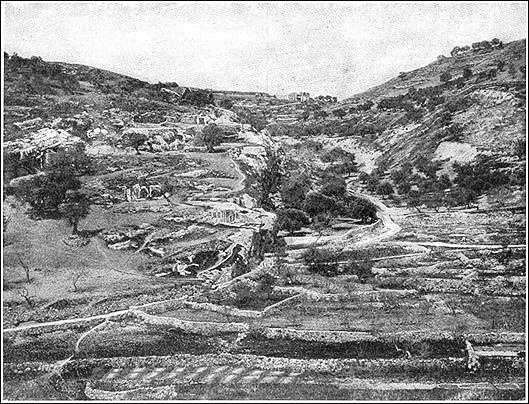
Valley of Hinnom (or Gehenna), c. 1900. The former site of child-sacrifice and a dumping-ground for the bodies of executed criminals, Jeremiah prophesied that it would become a "valley of slaughter" and burial place; in later literature it thus became identified with a new idea of Hell as a place where the wicked would be punished.

==== Sheol and the Old Testament ====
Beneath the earth is Sheol, the abode of the rephaim (shades), although it is not entirely clear whether all who died became shades, or only the "mighty dead" (compare Psalm 88:10 with Isaiah 14:9 and 26:14). Some biblical passages are interpreted by some as saying that God has no presence in the underworld: "In death there is no remembrance of Thee, in Sheol who shall give Thee thanks?" (Psalm 6). Others imply that the dead themselves are in some sense semi-divine, like the shade of the prophet Samuel, who is called an elohim, the same word used for God and gods. Still other passages state God's power over Sheol as over the rest of his creation: "Tho they (the wicked) dig into Sheol, from there shall my hand take them..." (Amos 9:2).

==== Intertestamental period ====
The Old Testament Sheol was simply the home of all the dead, good and bad alike. In the Hellenistic period the Greek-speaking Jews of Egypt, perhaps under the influence of Greek thought, came to believe that the good would go directly to God, while the wicked would really die and go to the realm of Hades, god of the underworld, where they would perhaps suffer torment. The Book of Enoch, dating from the period between the Old and New Testaments, separates the dead into a well-lit cavern for the righteous and dark caverns for the wicked, and provides the former with a spring, perhaps signifying that these are the "living" (i.e. a spring) waters of life.

==== New Testament ====
In the New Testament, Jesus' parable of the rich man and Lazarus reflects the idea that the wicked began their punishment in Hades immediately on dying.

==== Satan and the end of time ====
Hades in the New Testament is a temporary holding place, to be used only until the end of time, when its inhabitants will be thrown into the pit of Gehenna or the Lake of Fire (Revelation 20:10–14). This lake is either underground, or will go underground when the "new earth" emerges. The Satan does not inhabit or supervise the underworld – his sphere of activity is the human world – and is only to be thrown into the fire at the end of time. He appears throughout the Old Testament not as God's enemy but as his minister, "a sort of Attorney-General with investigative and disciplinary powers", as in the Book of Job. It was only with the early Church Fathers that he was identified with the serpent in the Garden of Eden and came to be seen as an active rebel against God, seeking to thwart the divine plan for humankind.

== See also ==
- Allegorical interpretations of Genesis
- Antediluvian
- Babylonian astronomy
- Babylonian cosmology
- Biblical names of stars
- Chronology of the Bible
- Classical planet
- Cosmogony
- Cosmological argument
- Creationist cosmologies
- Flat Earth
- Genesis creation narrative
- Geocentrism
- Hellenistic Judaism
- Jewish eschatology
- List of topics characterized as pseudoscience
- Mandaean cosmology
- Mormon cosmology
- Religious cosmology
- Seven Heavens

== Bibliography ==
- Aune, David E. (2003). "Cosmology". Westminster Dictionary of the New Testament and Early Christian Literature. Westminster John Knox Press. ISBN 9780664219178.
- Bautch, Kelley Coblentz (2003). A Study of the Geography of 1 Enoch 17-19. Brill. ISBN 9789004131033.
- Beale, G.K. (2004). The Temple and the Church's mission. InterVarsity Press. ISBN 9780830826186.
- Berlin, Adele (2011). "Cosmology and creation". In Berlin, Adele; Grossman, Maxine (eds.). The Oxford Dictionary of the Jewish Religion. Oxford University Press. ISBN 9780199730049.
- Bernstein, Alan E. (1996). The Formation of Hell: Death and Retribution in the Ancient and Early Christian Worlds. Cornell University Press. ISBN 0801481317.
- Bremmer, J.N. (1999). "Paradise in the Septuagint". In Luttikhuizen, Gerard P. (ed.). Paradise interpreted: representations of biblical paradise in Judaism and Christianity. Brill. ISBN 9004113312.
- Burnett, Joel S. (2010). Where is God?: divine absence in the Hebrew Bible. Fortress Press. ISBN 9781451411072.
- Collins, Adela Yarbro (2000). Cosmology and Eschatology in Jewish and Christian Apocalypticism. Brill. ISBN 9004119272.
- Dahl, Edward H.; Gauvin, Jean-Francois (2003). Sphaerae Mundi. McGill-Queen's Press - MQUP. ISBN 9780773521667.
- Davies, William David (1982). The Territorial Dimension of Judaism. University of California Press. ISBN 9780520043312.
- Deist, Ferdinand E. (2000). The material culture of the Bible: an introduction. Sheffield Academic Press. ISBN 9781841270982.
- Delumeau, Jean; O'Connell, Matthew (2000). Westminster Dictionary of the New Testament and Early Christian Literature. University of Illinois Press. ISBN 9780252068805.
- Farmer, Ronald L. (2005). Revelation. Chalice Press. ISBN 9780827232907.
- Fishbane, Michael (2003). Biblical Myth and Rabbinic Mythmaking. Oxford University Press. ISBN 0-19-826733-9.
- Fretheim, Terence E. (2003). "Heaven(s)". In Gowan, Donald E. (ed.). The Westminster theological wordbook of the Bible. Westminster University Press. ISBN 9780664223946.
- Gillingham, Susan (2002). The image, the depths, and the surface. Continuum. ISBN 9781841272979.
- Habel, Norman C. (1975). The Book of Job. Cambridge University Press. ISBN 9780521099431.
- Habel, Norman C. (2001). "Earth First: Inverse Cosmology in Job". In Habel, Norman C.; Wurst, Shirley (eds.). The Earth Story in Wisdom Traditions. Sheffield Academic Press. ISBN 9781841270869.
- Hartley, John E. (1988). The Book of Job. Eerdmans. ISBN 9780802825285.
- Hess, Richard S. (2007). Israelite Religions: An Archeological and Biblical Survey. Baker Academic Press. ISBN 9781441201126.
- Hiebert, Theodore (2009). "Genesis". In O'Day, Gail R.; Petersen, David L. (eds.). Theological Bible Commentary. Westminster John Knox Press. ISBN 9781611640304.
- Hoppe, Leslie J. (2000). The Holy City: Jerusalem in the theology of the Old Testament. Liturgical Press. ISBN 9780814650813.
- Horowitz, Wayne (1998). Mesopotamian cosmic geography. Eisenbrauns. ISBN 9780931464997.
- Janin, Hunt (2002). Four Paths to Jerusalem. McFarland. ISBN 9780786412648.
- Kaiser, Christopher B. (1997). Creational theology and the history of physical science. Brill. ISBN 9004106693.
- Keel, Othmar (1997). The symbolism of the biblical world. Eisenbrauns. ISBN 9781575060149.
- Kelly, Henry A. (2010). "Hell with Purgatory and two Limbos". In Moreira, Isabel; Toscano, Margaret (eds.). Hell and Its Afterlife: Historical and Contemporary Perspectives. Ashgate Publishing. ISBN 9780754667292.
- Kittel, Gerhard; Friedrich, Gerhard, eds. (1985). "Kosmos". Theological Dictionary of the New Testament. Eerdmans. ISBN 9780802824042.
- Knight, Douglas A. (1990). "Cosmology". In Watson E. Mills (ed.). Mercer Dictionary of the Bible. Mercer University Press. ISBN 9780865543737.
- Knight, Douglas A.; Levine, Amy-Jill (2011). The Meaning of the Bible: What the Jewish Scriptures and Christian Old Testament Can Teach Us. HarperCollins. ISBN 9780062098597.
- Kochańczyk-Bonińska, Karolina (2016). "The Concept Of The Cosmos According To Basil The Great's On The Hexaemeron" (PDF). Studia Pelplinskie. 48: 161–169.
- Lee, Sang Meyng (2010). The Cosmic Drama of Salvation. Mohr Siebeck. ISBN 9783161503160.
- Lucas, E.L. (2003). "Cosmology". In Alexander, T. Desmond; Baker, David W. (eds.). Dictionary of the Old Testament: Pentateuch. InterVarsity Press. ISBN 9780830817818.
- Mabie, F.J (2008). "Chaos and Death". In Longman, Tremper; Enns, Peter (eds.). Dictionary of the Old Testament. InterVarsity Press. ISBN 9780830817832.
- Mills, Watson E. (1998). "Introduction". Mercer Commentary on the Bible: Pentateuch/Torah. Mercer University Press. ISBN 9780865545069.
- Noort, Ed (1999). "Gan-Eden in the context of the mythology of the Hebrew bible". In Luttikhuizen, Gerard P. (ed.). Paradise interpreted: representations of biblical paradise in Judaism and Christianity. Brill. ISBN 9004113312.
- O'Dowd, R. (2008). "Creation imagery". In Longman, Tremper; Enns, Peter (eds.). Dictionary of the Old Testament. InterVarsity Press. ISBN 9780830817832.
- Olson, Daniel C. (2003). "1 Enoch". In Dunn, James; Rogerson, John William (eds.). Eerdmans commentary on the Bible. Eerdmans. ISBN 9780802837110.
- Page Lee, H. (1990). "Council, Heavenly". In Watson E. Mills (ed.). Mercer Dictionary of the Bible. Mercer University Press. ISBN 9780865543737.
- Parrish, V. Steven (1990). "Creation". In Watson E. Mills (ed.). Mercer Dictionary of the Bible. Mercer University Press. ISBN 9780865543737.
- Parsons, Mikeal (2008). Acts. Baker Academic. ISBN 9781585588213.
- Pennington, Jonathan T. (2007). Heaven and earth in the Gospel of Matthew. Brill. ISBN 978-9004162051.
- Perdue, Leo G. (1991). Wisdom in Revolt: Metaphorical Theology in the Book of Job. Sheffield Academic Press. ISBN 9780567649010.
- Reike, Bo (2001). "Hell". In Metzger, Bruce Manning; Coogan, Michael David (eds.). The Oxford guide to ideas & issues of the Bible. Oxford University Press. ISBN 9780195149173.
- Ringgren, Helmer (1990). "Yam". In Botterweck, G. Johannes; Ringgren, Helmer (eds.). Theological Dictionary of the Old Testament. Eerdmans. ISBN 9780802823304.
- Roberts, Alexander (2019). "A Re-Translation of Basil's Hexaemeral Homilies by ʿAbdallāh ibn al-Faḍl of Antioch". In Barbara, Roggema; Treiger, Alexander (eds.). Patristic Literature in Arabic Translations. Brill. pp. 198–240. doi:10.1163/9789004415041_009. ISBN 978-90-04-41504-1.
- Rochberg, Francesca (2010). In the Path of the Moon: Babylonian Celestial Divination and Its Legacy. Brill. ISBN 978-9004183896.
- Ryken, Leland; Wilhoit, Jim; Longman, Tremper; Duriez, Colin; Penney, Douglas; Reid, Daniel G., eds. (1998). "Cosmology". Dictionary of Biblical Imagery. InterVarsity Press. ISBN 9780830867332.
- Sarna, Nahum M. (1997). "The Mists of Time: Genesis I-II". In Feyerick, Ada (ed.). Genesis: World of Myths and Patriarchs. New York: NYU Press. p. 560. ISBN 0-8147-2668-2.
- Seybold, Klaus (1990). Introducing the Psalms. T&T Clarke. ISBN 9780567054234.
- Smith, Mark S. (2003). The Origins of Biblical Monotheism. Oxford University Press. ISBN 9780198030812.
- Stordalen, Terje (2000). Echoes of Eden. Peeters. ISBN 9789042908543.
- Tigghelaar, Eibert J.C. (1999). "Eden and Paradise". In Luttikhuizen, Gerard P. (ed.). Paradise interpreted: representations of biblical paradise in Judaism and Christianity. Brill. ISBN 9004113312.
- Walton, John H.; Matthews, Victor H.; Chavalas, Mark W., eds. (2000). The IVP Bible background commentary: Old Testament. InterVarsity Press. ISBN 9780830814190.
- Walton, John H. (2006). Ancient Near Eastern Thought and the Old Testament: Introducing the Conceptual World of the Hebrew Bible. Baker Academic. ISBN 0-8010-2750-0.
- Walton, John H. (2011). Genesis. Zondervan. ISBN 9780310866206.
- Welch, John Woodland (2009). The Sermon on the Mount in the light of the Temple. Ashgate. ISBN 9780754651642.
- White, Poel (2008). "Paul's Cosmology: The Witness of Romans, 1 and 2 Corinthians, and Galatians". In Pennington, Jonathan; McDonough, Sean (eds.). Cosmology and New Testament Theology. T&T Clark. ISBN 9780199730049.
- Wright, J. Edward (2002). The Early History of Heaven. Oxford University Press. ISBN 9780195348491.
- Wright, J. Edward (2004). "Whither Elijah?". In Chazon, Esther G.; Satran, David; Clements, Ruth (eds.). Things revealed: studies in early Jewish and Christian literature in honor of Michael E. Stone. Brill. ISBN 9004138854.
- Wyatt, Nick (2001). Space and Time in the Religious Life of the Near East. Sheffield University Press. ISBN 9781841272887.
