= Hexaemeron (Jacob of Serugh) =

6th-century Syriac commentary on Genesis

The Homilies on the Hexaemeron by Jacob of Serugh is the first known commentary on the Genesis creation narrative (i.e., a Hexaemeron) in Syriac literature, written by the early 6th century. This work was composed of seven homilies in total, with each homily being dedicated to one of the seven days.

Jacob opens his poetic homily with a prayer asking God to give him the ability to write about something that is beyond human speech. Jacob insists that God is the creator of all things and that creation occurred ex nihilo.

== Method ==
Jacob accepted the literalist and traditional method of exegesis of Genesis that was developed by the School of Antioch, which emerged in the fourth century under Diodorus of Tarsus, and had other influential advocates like Theodore of Mopsuestia. For example, Jacob rejected Augustine's view of simultaneous creation, believing instead that the world was progressively created over the course of a week. Despite adhering to the Antiochian tradition, and possibly intensely studying the works of its leaders during his youth, he came to condemn its leaders for their perceived Nestorianism.

== Six days of creation ==
According to Jacob, God created all the elements in the first day, and he would then use these elements to form other things in the following days, using the new, but still formless and dark Earth, as a template. When describing how God worked starting in the second day, Jacob distinguishes two types of processes, distinguished by the use of two different verbs: brʾ, "to create", which emphasizes the role of God as Creator who brings things about ex nihilo, and bdʿ, "to make", used later on and to signify God's role as a Workman who molds the created materials to produce additional forms and structures. When humans are made in the sixth day, they represent a microcosm of the universe, composed of the same elements (earth, water, fire, and air) that the universe was. The beauty and perfection of the human is also indicative of the creation of the universe. The creation of Eve and the first blessed couple is what also caused jealousy in the devil who reacts by causing humans to rebel. Therefore: the sixth day also represents the fall of Satan and his hosts.

== Cosmography ==
Following Genesis, Jacob places the creation of the firmament in the second day. Jacob believed that the firmament was dome-shaped, and analogized it using the popular architectural symbolism of the firmament as a domed church, the domed church being a microcosm of the cosmos. Jacob believed that the cosmos was like a two-storey building. The firmament separates the building into two stories, and it also divides the cosmic ocean into the upper waters, above the firmament, and the lower waters, below the earth, to create a dwelling place for mankind:

The firmament came to exist in the middle of the waters on the second day / As the Lord commanded it by a gesture of His creativity / And it became a limit between the waters for the waters above / And it became a shelter [mtaltha] for this dry place beneath / And it became a tent [maikna = Tabernacle] for the pounded depth of the whole world / And in its shadow dwells and rests the entire Creation / It became the ceiling [tatlldl] for the great house of humankind / That the gesture of the Deity built from nothing / It became like a vault [kaphtha] that hangs and stands without foundation / And not columns but a gesture supports it.

The earthly region was where the physical world existed. This region extended up until the firmament, beyond which was the domain of the spiritual world. For the earth, the firmament is a roof, and for the spiritual world, the firmament is its floor. Besides the cosmic ocean, sitting above the firmament and below the earth, Jacob also believed in a subterranean hell below the earth, but its immeasurable depths make its dimensions beyond what humans perceive on earth. The celestial bodies (like the stars) are created out of a primordial light, and day and night are explained by the suns movement behind the northern cosmic mountains. Jacob never explicitly calls the earth flat, though indirect expressions, such as comparing the earth to a floor, indicate that he held this view. For Jacob, the earth was likely in the shape of a circular disk.

Jacob also participated in debates about the pillars that the firmament stood on. Basil of Caesarea, in his own Hexaemeron, took the references to the pillars in the Psalms to refer to God's power. In the fourth century, the Syriac Christian Aphrahat asserted that the firmament stands "without pillars". Following this position, Jacob asserted that the firmament only stood by God's power, and without visible pillars to rest on. Jacob's homilies helped spread this idea, and traces of its influence can be found in an anonymous mid-6th century hymn in a church dedicated to Saint Sophia in Edessa, and in the cosmology of the Quran.

== Angels ==
Jacob believed that angels were created by God during the creation period from either light or fire. Whereas others, such as Theodore of Mopsuestia, believed that the angels were confined below the firmament, Jacob believed that they could exist in the heavenly realm and that they did so, constantly praising God therein.

== Necessity of creation ==
Alongside others in the Syriac tradition, such as Ephrem the Syrian and Narsai, Jacob did not believe that God needed the creation: "when He had no need for it, He created them [creatures], and magnified them, as He was great, with beauties of their natures".

== Related works ==
A related earlier work was the Commentary on Genesis by Ephrem the Syrian, although this text was not a Hexaemeron (commentary on the six days of creation). The Hexaemeral genre in the Christian tradition was initiated earlier in the fourth century, with the Hexaemeron of Basil of Caesarea, but there is no indication that Jacob knew of it.

== Syriac editions ==
- Paulus Bedjan (ed) with additional material by Sebastian P. Brock. Homilies of Mar Jacob of Sarug. 6 vols.; Piscataway: Gorgias Press, 2006.

== Translations ==
- Four homilies on creation. Jaques de Saroug (1989). Khalil Alwan (ed.). Quatre homélies métriques sur la création (in French). Leuven: Peeters.
- Homily on the seven days of creation translated by Edward G. Mathews Jr.:
  - First day: Mathews Jr. (2009). Jacob of Sarug's homilies on the six days of creation. The first day. Gorgias Press. ISBN 978-1607243236.
  - Second day of creation. Jacob of Sarug's homilies on the six days of creation. The second day. Gorgias Press. 2016.
  - Third day. Jacob of Sarug's homilies on the six days of creation. The third day. Gorgias Press. 2016.
  - Fourth day. Jacob of Sarug's homilies on the six days of creation. The fourth day. Gorgias Press. 2018.
  - Fifth day. Jacob of Sarug's homilies on the six days of creation. The fifth day. Gorgias Press. 2019.
  - Sixth day. Jacob of Sarug's homilies on the six days of creation. The sixth day. Gorgias Press. 2020.
  - Seventh day. Jacob of Sarug's homilies on the six days of creation. The seventh day. Gorgias Press. 2021.
- Jacob of Serugh's Hexaemeron. Muraoka, T (2018). Jacob of Serugh's Hexaemeron. Peeters.

== See also ==
- Letter to the Himyarites
- Hexaemeron (Jacob of Edessa)
