= Cosmas Indicopleustes =

6th-century Greek traveller and merchant

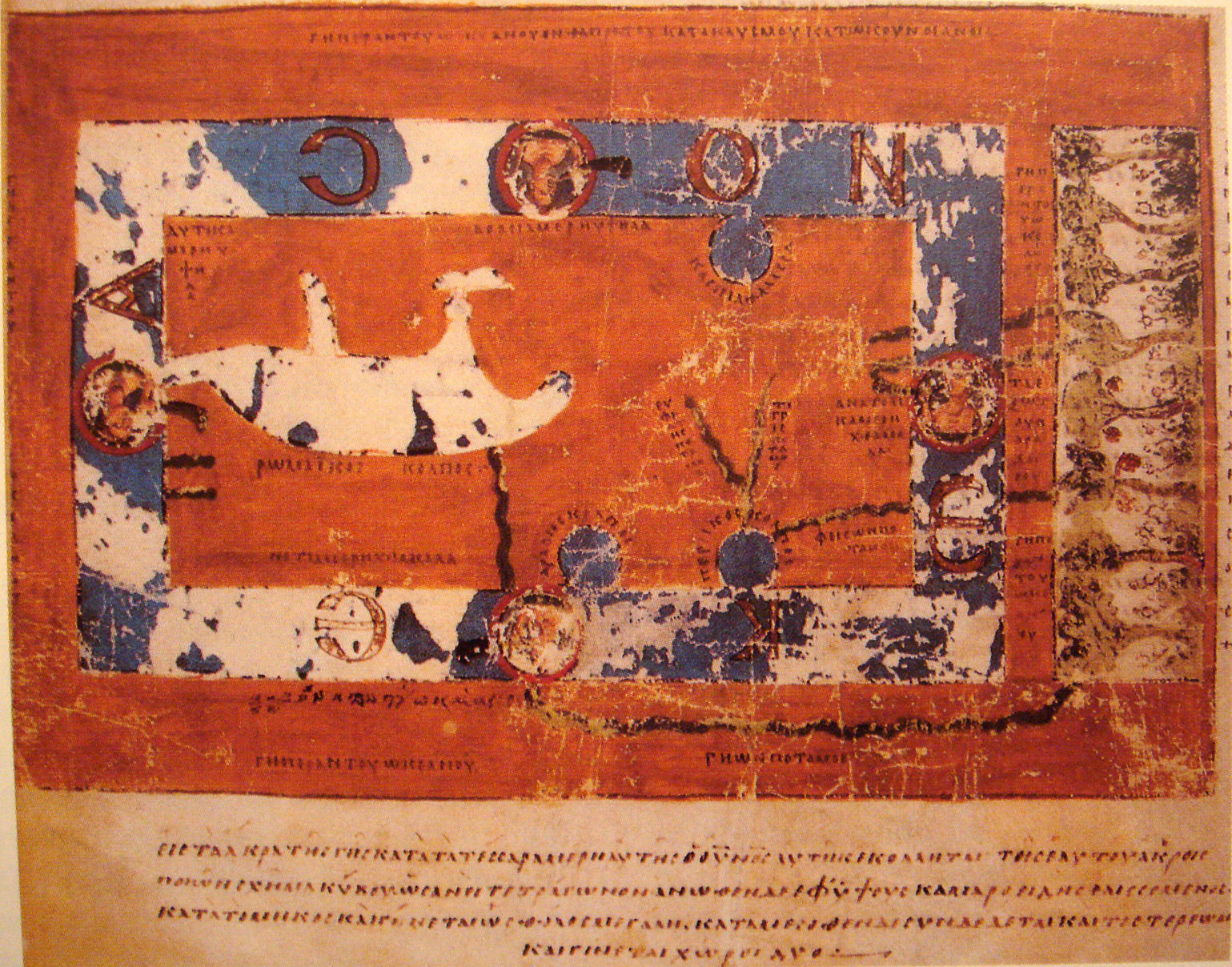
World map, by Cosmas Indicopleustes. The map is oriented with north to the top.

Cosmas Indicopleustes (Koine Greek: Κοσμᾶς Ἰνδικοπλεύστης, lit. 'Cosmas who sailed to India'; also known as Cosmas the Monk) was a 6th-century merchant and later hermit from Alexandria in Egypt. However, despite his moniker, "Cosmas the Monk", Cosmas himself says nothing that would indicate his involvement with monastic life. He was a traveller who made several voyages to the Kingdom of Aksum, and India during the reign of emperor Justinian. His work Christian Topography contained some of the earliest and most famous world maps. Cosmas was a pupil of the East Syriac Patriarch Aba I and was himself a follower of the Church of the East. In fact, Cosmas is the one who provided the earliest most definitive evidence that the Nestorians were in India in the mid sixth century. At this time, Cosmas became a student of the future East Syrian patriarch. Cosmas's careful account regarding the spread of the Nestorian churches shows important information, specifically regarding the Church of the East's southern branch. He shows that Syriac and Persian were coequal in regards to the language of Christian introduction and commerce.

== Indicopleustes ==
"Indicopleustes" means "Indian voyager", from πλέω "(I) sail". While it is known from classical literature, especially the Periplus Maris Erythraei, that there had been trade between the Roman Empire and India from the first century BC onwards, Cosmas's report is one of the few from individuals who had actually made the journey. He described and sketched some of what he saw in his Topography. Some of these have been copied into the existing manuscripts, the oldest dating to the 9th century. In 522 AD, he mentions several ports of trade on the Malabar Coast (South India). He is the first traveller to mention Soriyani Christians in present-day Kerala in India. He wrote:

"Even in Taprobane, an island in Further India, where the Indian sea is, there is a Church of Christians, with clergy and a body of believers, but I know not whether there be any Christians in the parts beyond it. In the country called Malê, where the pepper grows, there is also a church, and at another place called Calliana there is moreover a bishop, who is appointed from Persia. In the island, again, called the Island of Dioscoridês, which is situated in the same Indian sea, and where the inhabitants speak Greek, having been originally colonists sent thither by the Ptolemies who succeeded Alexander the Macedonian, there are clergy who receive their ordination in Persia, and are sent on to the island, and there is also a multitude of Christians. […] The island [of Sri Lanka] has also a church of Persian Christians who have settled there, and a Presbyter who is appointed from Persia, and a Deacon and a complete ecclesiastical ritual. But the natives and their kings are heathens."

== Voyage ==
Around AD 550, while a monk in the retirement of a Sinai cloister,^{[1]} Cosmas wrote the once-copiously illustrated Christian Topography, a work partly based on his personal experiences as a merchant on the Red Sea and Indian Ocean in the early 6th century. Although there has been debate, it can be determined that Cosmas wrote his famous description in Alexandria.^{[2]} His description of India and Ceylon during the 6th century is invaluable to historians. Cosmas also provides invaluable information regarding the transferring of silk, located in China to the west.^{[3]} Cosmas seems to have personally visited the Kingdom of Axum in modern day northern Ethiopia, as well as Eritrea. He sailed along the coast of Socotra, but it cannot be ascertained that he really visited India and Ceylon. Interestingly, Cosmas is the earliest Greek writer known to have learned, through secondhand accounts, that there was a sea to the east of China. Michael Kordosis notes that even the great geographer Ptolemy did not know this, and places the east of China as "Unknown land".^{[4]}

== Christian Topography ==
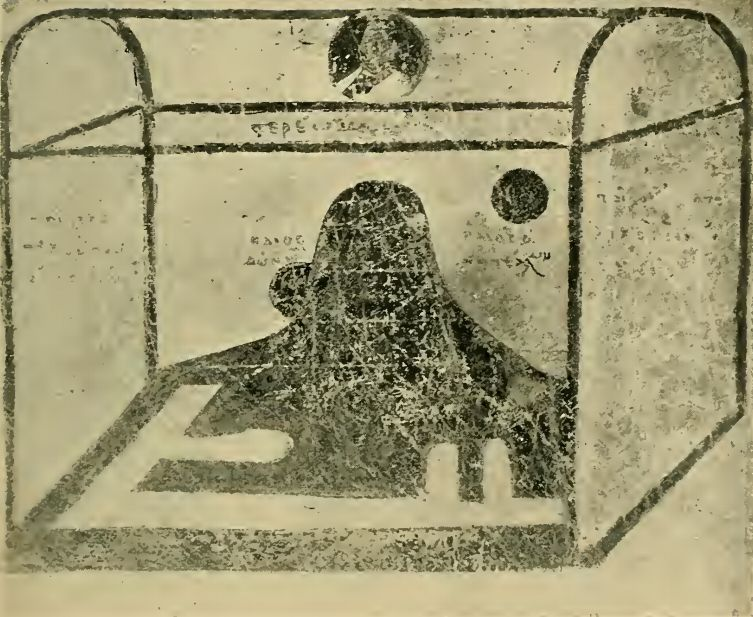
A theoretical model of the universe.

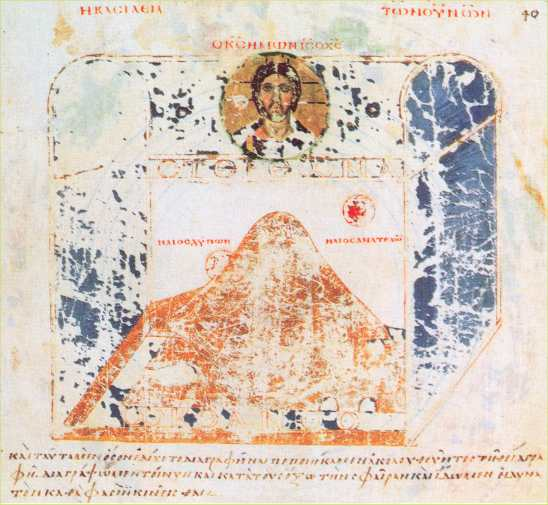
World picture from Christian Topography.

Cosmas's topography manuscripts survived all the centuries and physical copies are around today. The Christian topography has been preserved in two copies, one being a parchment manuscript entailing the 10th century, which is located at the Laurentian library in Florence, Italy. This copy contains almost all of Cosmas's work. There are also 8th and 9th century manuscripts by Cosmas, located at the Vatican library; these manuscripts contain some of Cosmas's sketches. The imperial library in Vienna also holds a few pages of Cosma's topography. A major feature of his Christian Topography is his worldview that the surface of ocean and earth is flat (that is, nonconvex and nonspherical, as perceived by the human senses) and that the heavens form the shape of a box with a curved lid. He was scornful of Ptolemy and others who held that the world's surface was, contrary to human perceptual experience, a spherical shape. Cosmas aimed to prove that pre-Christian geographers had been wrong in asserting that the surface of the earth and surface of the ocean was convex and spherical in shape, and that it was in fact modelled on the tabernacle, the house of worship described to Moses by God during the Jewish Exodus from Egypt. In the centre of the plane is the inhabited earth, surrounded by ocean, beyond which lies the paradise of Adam. The sun revolves round a conical mountain to the north: round the summit in summer, round the base in winter, which accounts for the difference in the length of the day. Cosmas also frequently drew little sketches on his manuscripts. As Watson and McCrindle noted, Cosmas was talented in drawing and relished any opportunity to cover his manuscripts in illustrative sketches.

However, his idea that the surface of the ocean and earth is nonspherical had been a minority view among educated Western opinion since the 3rd century BC. Cosmas's view was never influential even in religious circles; a near-contemporary Christian, John Philoponus, sought to refute him in his De opificio mundi as did many Christian philosophers of the era.

David C. Lindberg asserts:

Cosmas was not particularly influential in Byzantium, but he is important for us because he has been commonly used to buttress the claim that all (or most) medieval people believed they lived on a flat earth. This claim...is totally false. Cosmas is, in fact, the only medieval European known to have defended a flat earth cosmology, whereas it is safe to assume that all educated Western Europeans (and almost one hundred percent of educated Byzantines), as well as sailors and travelers, believed in the earth's sphericity.

One of the few medieval authorities that makes any mention of Cosmas is Photius, the ninth-century patriarch of Constantinople. However, he describes Comas’ style as very poor. Singling out his specific conception of the organization of the universe, Photius states that much of what Cosmas says is incredible. Cosmas, he concludes, might more properly be considered a fabulist rather than a trustworthy authority:

“His style is very poor, and he employs a structure beneath the usual standard. He also writes certain things that are incredible and not sufficiently faithful to historical truth; on account of which he ought more rightly to be regarded as a fable writer rather than a truthful historian. Among the fables he recounts, he sets forth roughly the following doctrines: that the heavens are not of spherical form, nor is the earth; but that the former is like a vault, and the latter longer on one side, and at its extremities joined to the boundaries of the heavens.”

Cosmas was mentioned in Umberto Eco's historical novel, Baudolino. In the book, a Byzantine priest and spy, Zozimas of Chalcedon, refers to his world topography as the key to finding the mythical Prester John:

Well, in the empire of us Romans, centuries ago there lived a great sage, Cosmas Indicopleustes, who traveled to the very confines of the world, and in his Christian Topography demonstrated in irrefutable fashion that the earth truly is in the form of a tabernacle, and that only thus can we explain the most obscure phenomena.

Cosmology aside, Cosmas proves to be an interesting and reliable guide, providing a window into a world that has since disappeared. He happened to be in Adulis on the Red Sea Coast of modern Eritrea at the time (c. AD 525) when the King of Axum was preparing a military expedition to attack the Jewish king Dhu Nuwas in Yemen, who had recently been persecuting Christians. On request of the Axumite king and in preparation for this campaign, he recorded now-vanished inscriptions such as the Monumentum Adulitanum which he mistook for a continuation of another monument detailing Ptolemy III Euergetes's conquests in Asia. Neither have been located by archeologists. Allusions in the Topography suggest that Cosmas was also the author of a larger cosmography, a treatise on the motions of the stars, and commentaries on the Psalms and Canticles.

== See also ==
- Chronology of European exploration of Asia
