= Christian Topography =

Geography work by Cosmas Indicopleustes (c. 550)

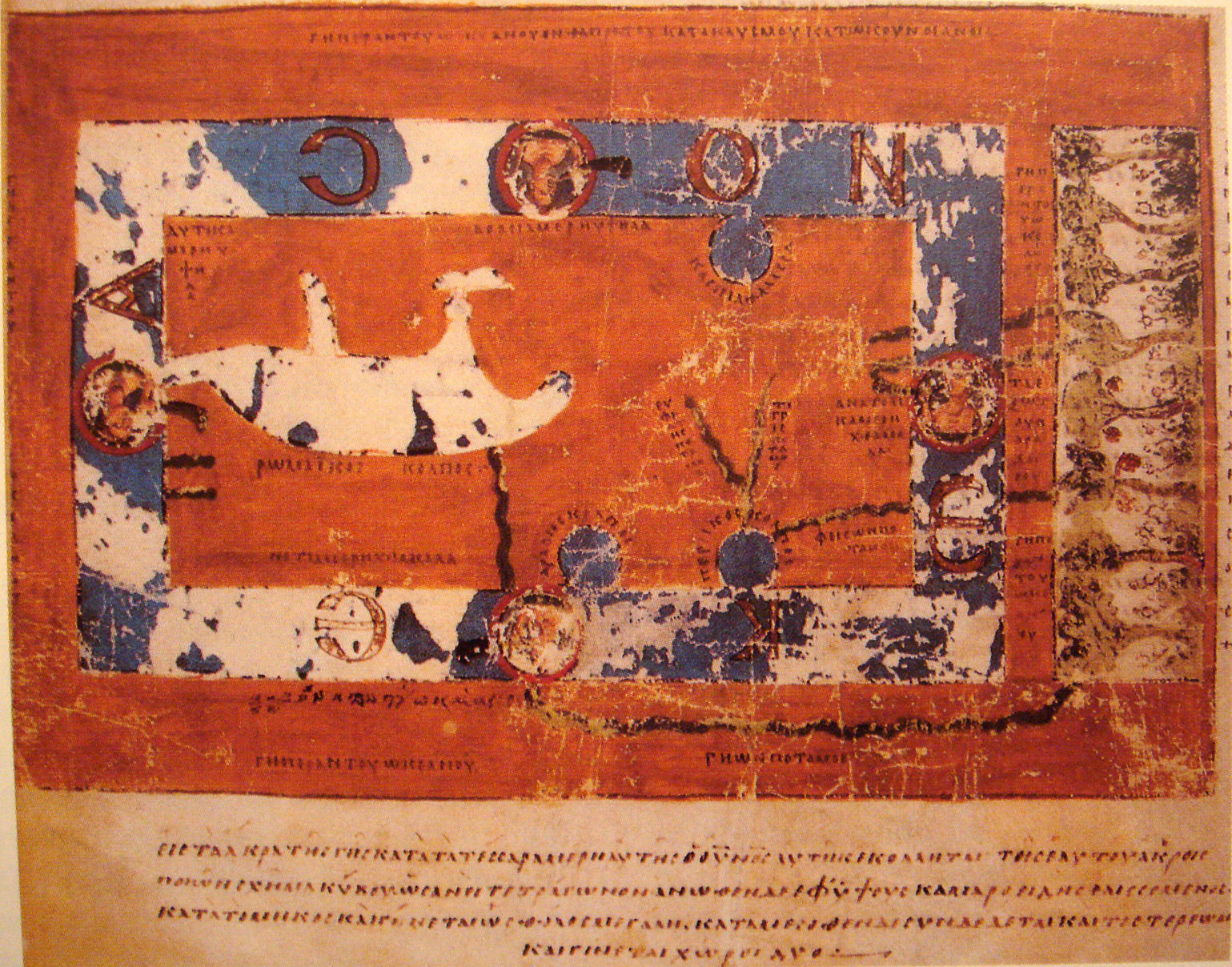
Ancient world map, from Christian Topography, by Cosmas Indicopleustes.

The Christian Topography (Ancient Greek: Χριστιανικὴ Τοπογραφία, Latin: Topographia Christiana) is a 6th-century work, one of the earliest essays in scientific geography written by a Christian author. It originally consisted of five books written by Cosmas Indicopleustes and expanded to ten and eventually to twelve books at around 550 AD.

== Structure ==
The Christian Topography spans twelve books. The entire work began as five books, but later, Cosmas added the sixth to tenth books in one stage, and then the eleventh and twelfth books in a second stage. The titles of each of the books are:

- Book 1. The Places and Figures of the Universe; the heresy affirming that the Heavens are spherical, and that there are Antipodes; Pagan errors as to the causes of rain and of earthquakes
- Book 2. The position, figure, length and breadth of the earth; the site of Paradise; the Greek inscriptions at Adulé; extract from Ephorus; the ancient empires; the Fall of Man and its effect on the Angels; the circumcision of angels, demons and souls
- Book 3. The Tower of Babel; the Mission of Moses to the Israelites; comments on his history of the Creation of the World; the conversion of the nations to Christianity
- Book 4. A recapitulation of the views advanced; theory of eclipses; doctrine of the sphere denounced
- Book 5. Description of the Tabernacle; Patriarchs and Prophets who predicted the coming of Christ and the future state; the agreement of these with the Apostles
- Book 6. The size of the Sun; a dissertation on the two states
- Book 7. The Duration of the Heavens
- Book 8. Interpretation of the Song of Hezekiah; the retrogression of the Sun; ancient dials; predictions referring to Cyrus
- Book 9. Courses of the Sun and Moon and other heavenly bodies; their movements effected by the angels
- Book 10. Passages from the Christian Fathers confirming the Author’s views
- Book 11. Description of certain Indian animals and plants, and of the island of Taprobané (Ceylon)
- Book 12. Old Testament narratives confirmed by Chaldean, Babylonian, Persian and Egyptian records; the island Atlantis

== Cosmology ==
Cosmas Indicopleustes, the author of the Christian Topography, put forward the idea that the world is flat. Originally written in Greek with illustrations and maps, his view of the flatness of the world may have been influenced by some Jewish and Eastern contemporaries. While most of the Christians of the same period maintained that the Earth was a sphere, the work advances the idea that the world is flat, and that the heavens form the shape of a box with a curved lid, and especially attacks the idea that the heavens were spherical and in motion, now known as the geocentric model of the universe. The author cites passages from the Christians' scriptures which he interprets originally in order to support his thesis, and attempts to argue down the idea of a spherical Earth by stigmatizing it as "pagan". An early surviving reference to the work is by Patriarch Photios I of Constantinople in the 9th century AD. Photius condemns the style and syntax of the text as well as the honesty of the author. More recent authors tend to agree with Photius on the stylistic points, but to find the work generally reliable for geographical and historical references. Edward Gibbon, for example, said "the nonsense of the Monk was, nevertheless, mingled with the practical knowledge of the traveller" and used it in writing The History of the Decline and Fall of the Roman Empire.

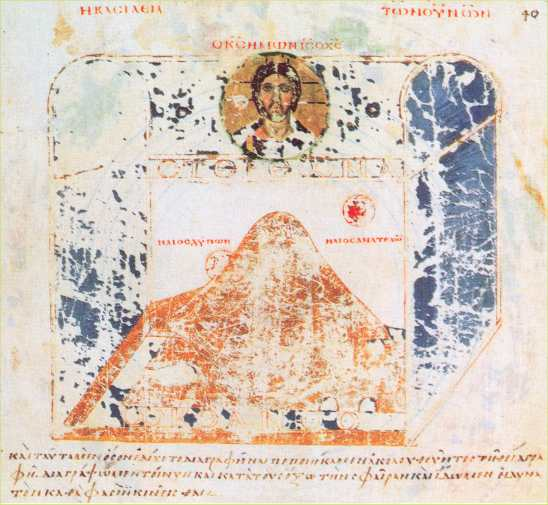
The world according to the book is a parallelogram.

The Topography is often erroneously cited as evidence that Christianity introduced the idea of the flat-Earth into the world, and brought in the age of ignorance. The latter pages of his work are devoted to rebutting the criticism of his fellow monks. He repeatedly denounces "those reprobate Christians who, ..., prefer, through their perverse folly or downright wickedness, to adopt the miserable Pagan belief that earth and heaven are spherical, and that there are Antipodes on whom the rain must fall up." Raymond Beazley, in the first volume of The Dawn of Modern Geography (1897), said

The place of Cosmas in history has been sometimes misconceived. His work is not, as it has been called (in the earlier years of this century), the chief authority of the Middle Ages in geography. For, on the whole, its influence is only slightly, and occasionally, traceable. Its author stated his position as an article of Christian faith, but even in those times there was anything but a general agreement with his positive conclusions. . . The subtleties of Cosmas were left to the Greeks, for the most part; the western geographers who pursued his line of thought were usually content to stop short at the merely negative dogmas of the Latin Fathers; and no great support was given to the constructive tabernacle system of the Indian merchant. ... Yet, after all, the Christian Topography. must always be remarkable. It is one of the earliest important essays in scientific or strictly theoretic geography, within the Christian aera [sic], written by a Christian thinker.

== Geography ==
Besides the cosmological elements of the book, Christian Topography provides insight into the geographical knowledge of Byzantium, it is also the only Greek work with both text and illustrations surviving from the 6th century. "Indicopleustes" means "The one who has sailed to India". While it is known from classical literature that there had been trade between the Roman Empire and India, Cosmas was one of the individuals who had actually made the journey.

What the Christian Topography reports about Sri Lanka:

The island as it is in a central position is much frequented by ships from all parts of India and from Persia and Ethiopia. And from the remotest countries, I mean Tzinitza and other trading places, it receives silk, alocs, cloves, sandalwood and other products and these again are passed into marts on this side such as Male, where pepper grows, and to Calliana which exports copper and sesame-logs and cloth for making dresses, for it is also a great place for business. And to Sindhu also where musk and Castor is procured, and androstachy, and to Persia and the Homerite country and to Adule. And the island receives imports from all these marts which we have mentioned and passes them onto remote ports, while at the same time exporting its own produce in both directions. Sindhu is the frontier of India, for the river of India, that is, the Phison, which discharges into the Persian Gulf, forms the boundary between Persia and India. The most notable places of trade in India are these: Sindhu, Orrhotha, Callian, Sibor.

Indeed, we learn from his book that he had travelled over much of the Red Sea coast, and as far as modern Sri Lanka. He described and sketched some of what he saw in his Topography. Some of these have been copied into the existing manuscripts.

When not expounding his cosmology, Cosmas proves to be an interesting and reliable guide, providing a window into a world that has since disappeared. He happened to be in Ethiopia when the King of Axum was preparing a 522 or 525 AD military expedition to attack Jewish Arabs in Yemen. He recorded now-vanished inscriptions such as the Monumentum Adulitanum (which he mistakenly attributed to Ptolemy III Euergetes).

== Manuscripts ==
Three nearly complete manuscripts are known to exist. The earliest and best is from the 9th century, and is in the Vatican Library. This text has only ten books. Two closely related manuscripts of the 11th century, one from the Saint Catherine's Monastery and the other probably originally from the Iviron monastery of Mount Athos, contain twelve books and comment on the prophets in the same order that Theodore of Mopsuestia preferred rather than in Septuagint order as in the copy from the Vatican Library. The eleventh and twelfth books may originally have been parts of other works by the same author. Portions of book five appear more frequently as a marginal commentary upon the psalms, and it is the name given to the author in these commentaries that is now used.

== Influence ==
The influence of Cosmas was marginal, especially due to his background as a Nestorian who lived beyond the borders of the Byzantine Empire.

David C. Lindberg asserts: "Cosmas was not particularly influential in Byzantium, but he is important for us because he has been commonly used to buttress the claim that all (or most) medieval people believed they lived on a flat earth. This claim...is totally false. Cosmas is, in fact, the only medieval European known to have defended a flat earth cosmology, whereas it is safe to assume that all educated Western Europeans (and almost one hundred percent of educated Byzantines), as well as sailors and travellers, believed in the earth's sphericity." One of the contemporaries of Cosmas, John Philoponus, wrote a refutation of his work in his De opificio mundi (On the Creation of the World).
