= Hexaemeron (Basil of Caesarea) =

Commentary on Genesis creation narrative by Basil of Caesarea

The Hexaemeron of Basil of Caesarea (d. 379) is a fourth-century Greek commentary on the Genesis creation narrative (or a Hexaemeron). It is the first known work in this genre by a Christian, following Jewish predecessors of the genre like Philo of Alexandria's De opificio mundi and a now lost work by Aristobulus of Alexandria.

Basil's Hexaemeron was composed over the course of nine homilies on the topic of the six days of creation, moving line by line through Genesis 1:1–26. His Hexaemeron originated as a lecture series that he delivered to the congregation of Caesarea Maritima over the course of three days in the year 378 AD. The audience was likely a group of "average" Christians, as opposed to fellow Christian intellectuals or a group that he would have considered to have been spiritually advanced.

== Influences ==
In his homilies on the Hexaemeron, Basil covers a wide variety of subjects: the preexistence of matter and eternity of the world, the purpose of the world, the contemplation of beings, composition of the four elements, movement of the stars, behavior of the creatures of the land, waters, and air, etc. Many, if not all of these, were already motifs among classical authors such as Plato, Aristotle, the Stoics, and so forth. More recently, some have sought to focus on passing hints of influence by Plotinus as well, such as in Basil's use of the term sympatheia. As for the zoological information contained in Basil's works, while it has typically been thought that this came from his reading of the works of Aristotle, a recent re-evaluation has argued that Basil drew on a wider variety of sources and that his principal source was the Halieutica of Oppian. The genesis of Basil's knowledge of astronomy has also been studied and has been argued to have originated during his youth.

== Content ==
On the topic of the eternity of the world, Basil takes on these subjects include that the world is not eternal but is in fact created. With respect to the position that the Creator eternally coexisted alongside the creation, Basil says that this is not possible due to their fundamentally different nature (not to mention that, for Basil, could matter be in no way equal to God). Theologically, Basil argues that the wording of Genesis — that God "created" as opposed to "worked" or formed" — indicates an absolute beginning. Commenting on Genesis 1:2 and the question of whether the world was created ex nihilo as opposed to ex materia (from pre-existing matter), he defends creation ex nihilo. The description in the scripture of the world having been unformed, says Basil, is reasonable on the basis of the then-absence of elements such as vegetation. Basil rejects the doctrine, found among some philosophical schools such as Stoicism, of eternal return, that is, the periodic conflagration (destruction) and rebirth of the cosmos. All created beings have been planned ahead of time by God and are necessary within God's conceived plan, and the creation reflects back on and results in admiration on the Creator. The cosmos itself, then, acts as a sign of God's existence:

May He Who has given us intelligence to recognize in the smallest objects of creation the great wisdom of the Contriver make us find in great bodies a still higher idea of their Creator. However, compared with their Author, the sun and moon are but a fly and an ant. The whole universe cannot give us a right idea of the greatness of God; and it is only by signs, weak and slight in themselves, often by the help of the smallest insects and of the least plants, that we raise ourselves to Him.

Basil offered many architectural analogies for the cosmos, including an amphitheater where its participants are not merely spectators but "fellow combatants" (i.e. participants) and as a training ground for people to try and come to know God.

== Method of interpretation ==
Basil's Hexaemeron was composed over the course of nine homilies, and originated as a lecture series by Basil to the congregation of Caesarea Maritima over the course of three days in the year 378 AD. Basil was familiar with the allegorical mode of interpretation dominant at the Alexandrian school and the literal form of interpretation dominant at the Antiochene school. In his Hexaemeron, he sided with the literalist mode. For example, he wrote: "For me grass is grass; plant, fish, wild beast, domestic animal, I take all in the literal sense." Basil was also in communication with Diodorus of Tarsus, a known polemicist against the Alexandrian school, with whom he may have exchanged ideas about the subject. Basil commented that allegorical interpretations result in excessive interpretations which become lavish with the meaning of the text, and as being often opposed to the plain or common sense reading of the text. However, Basil was not opposed in toto to the use of allegorical understandings of the text: instead, his primary issue was with excessive allegorization as opposed to the allegorical interpretations found in authors like Origen. One example he spoke of concerned the statement in Genesis 1:2 that the "Darkness upon the deep": Basil said that this passage had become the source of many myths such as the notion that the "Darkness" referred to represented an "evil power" or a "personification of evil". Basil also associated these forms of uncontrolled exegeses with heretical sects such as Manichaeans, Marcionites, and Valentinians.

== Reception ==
Due to its popularity, it was translated into numerous languages including Latin, Armenian, Syriac, Georgian, and Arabic. Later still, it was translated into Old Church Slavonic, indicating the continued interest in the work over long periods of time. A translation into Coptic must have also existed. Basil's brother, Gregory of Nyssa, produced his own text titled In Hexaemeron and well as praised his Hexaemeron as being as admirable as the holy texts of Moses. As the first in a line of many Christians works in the genre of Hexaemeral literature, his led to many others producing their own Hexaemeron as well as imitations of his text. For example, another of his contemporaries, Ambrose, produced an imitation. Jerome mentions only three of Basil's works: his Hexaemeron, his De Spiritu Sancto, and his Contra Eunomium. The Latin translation inspired Augustine to produce his own Hexaemeron, and was quoted by Isidore of Seville, the Venerable Bede, and Thomas Aquinas.

== Translations ==
- Clare Way, Agnes Clare. St. Basil: Exegetic Homilies, The Catholic University of America Press, 2003.

== See also ==
- Jacob of Serugh
