= Jacob of Serugh =

Syrian writer and bishop (c. 451–521)

Saint Jacob of Serugh
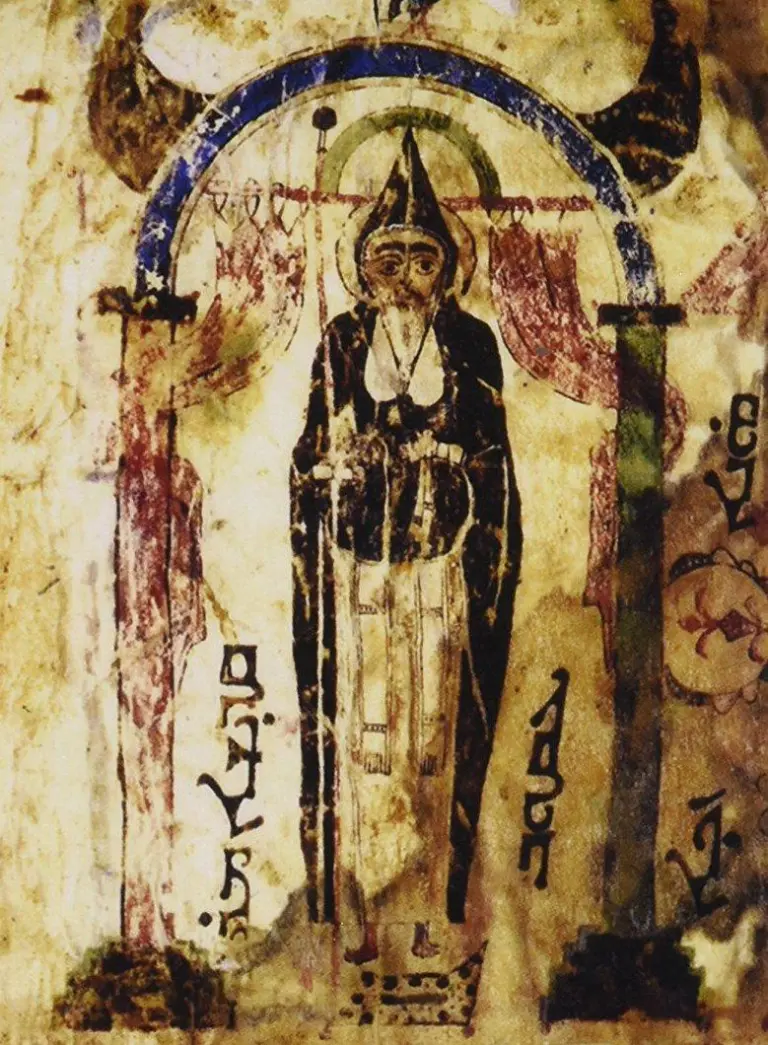
- Syriac depiction of Jacob of Serugh, from ancient manuscript

Deacon, Priest, Bishop
- Born: c. 451 AD; Kurtam on the Euphrates (near Harran)
- Died: 29 November 521 AD; Batnan daSrugh, Byzantine Empire (modern-day Suruç, Urfa, Turkey)
- Venerated in: Catholic Church; Oriental Orthodox Church
- Canonized: Pre-congregation
- Major shrine: St. Mary Church, Diyarbakır
- Feast: 29 November (Roman Catholic, Oriental Orthodox); 3 Koiak (Coptic calendar)
- Attributes: Staff, pointed hood, flute

Jacob of Serugh (Syriac: ܝܥܩܘܒ ܕܣܪܘܓ, romanized: Yaʿquḇ daSruḡ, Classical Syriac pronunciation: [ˌjaˤˈquβ das'ruɣ]; Latin: Iacobus Sarugiensis; c. 452–521), also called Jacob of Sarug or Mar Jacob (Syriac: ܡܪܝ ܝܥܩܘܒ, romanized: Mār Yaʿquḇ), was one of the foremost poets and theologians of the Syriac Christian tradition and authors of Syriac literature, second only to Ephrem the Syrian and equal to Narsai. He lived most of his life as an ecclesiastical official in Suruç, in modern-day Turkey. He became a bishop (of Batnan) near the end of his life in 519. He was a Miaphysite (Oriental Orthodox Non-Chalcedonian Christianity), albeit moderate compared to his contemporaries.

Jacob is best known for the homilies he wrote in the late fifth and early sixth centuries. He wrote in prose, as well as in 12-syllable (dodecasyllabic) meter, which he invented, and he was known for his eloquence. According to Jacob of Edessa, he composed 763 works during his lifetime. Around 400 survive, and over 200 of those have been published. The longest is about 1,400 verses. By the time of his death, he had a great reputation. His works were so popular that of any author from late antiquity, only the writings of Augustine of Hippo and John Chrysostom survive in a greater number of manuscripts than Jacob's.

His work earned him many nicknames, including "Flute of the Holy Spirit" (which also belonged to his predecessor Ephrem the Syrian), and "Lyre of the Believing Church" (in Antiochene Syriac Orthodox Christianity). Both Non Chalcedonian and Chalcedonian traditions of Christianity now take him as a saint.

== Life ==
Jacob was born around the middle of the fifth century in the village of Kurtam (ܟܘܪܬܘܡ) on the Euphrates in the ancient region of Serugh, which stood as the eastern part of the province of Commagene (corresponding to the modern districts of Suruç and Birecik). He was educated in the famous School of Edessa and became chorepiscopus back in the Serugh area, serving rural churches of Haura (ܚܘܪܐ, Ḥaurâ). His tenure of this office extended over a time of great trouble to the Christian population of Mesopotamia, due to the fierce war carried on by the Sasanian emperor Kavadh I within the Roman borders.

In 519 and at the age of 67, Jacob was elected bishop of the main city of the area, called in Syriac Baṭnān d-Sruḡ (ܒܛܢܢ ܕܣܪܘܓ). As Jacob was born in the same year as the controversial Council of Chalcedon, he lived through the intense rifts that split Eastern Christianity, which led to most Syriac speakers being separated from Chalcedonian Christianity. Even though imperial persecution of anti-Chalcedonians became increasingly brutal towards the end of Jacob's life, he remained surprisingly quiet on such divisive theological and political issues. However, when pressed in correspondence by Paul, bishop of Edessa, he openly expressed dissatisfaction with the proceedings of Chalcedon and overall Dyophysite Christology.

Little more is known about the life of Jacob, as Jacob's biography was not documented in detail. One contemporary account of his life, the Chronicle of Pseudo-Joshua the Stylite, focuses on his vast literary output and its wide distribution:

The honored Jacob, the periodeutes by whom many homilies were composed on sections of the scriptures and songs and canticles constructed for the time of the locusts, also did not turn away in this time from what was appropriate for him. Rather he wrote admonitory letters to all the cities, making them trust in the salvation of God and encouraging them not to flee.

One manuscript written two years after his death calls him the "bishop of Batnae". Some information about Jacob's life can also be gleaned from his writings. For example, he writes in his correspondence with monastery of Mar Bassus:

Forty-five years ago, I was dwelling in the city of Edessa in the study of the divine scriptures, at the time when the writings of the wicked Diodoros were being translated from Greek into Syriac. In the city there was a school of the Persians that adhered to the thought of the foolish Diodoros with much affection, and the whole East was corrupted by that school.

== Literary activity ==
Jacob's style was to write in the genres of metrical homily (mimre) and madroshe (narrative or verse poems without strophies), sugyoto (dialogue poems with an acrostic), and turgome (prose homilies for liturgical feasts).

Jacob's literary activity was unceasing. According to Bar Hebraeus (Chron. Eccles. i. 191) he employed 70 amanuenses and wrote in all 760 metrical homilies, besides expositions, letters and hymns of different sorts. Jacob's style was to write in dodecasyllabic metre, dealing mainly with biblical themes, but also on the deaths of Christian martyrs, the fall of the idols and the First Council of Nicaea.

Of Jacob's prose works, which are not nearly so numerous, the most interesting are his letters, which throw light upon some of the events of his time and reveal his attachment to Miaphysitism, which was then struggling for supremacy in the Syriac churches, and particularly at Edessa, over the opposite teaching of Nestorius.

The Hexaemeron of Jacob of Serugh was the first Hexaemeral work (dedicated commentary to the Genesis creation narrative) to be composed in Syriac. He was followed by other authors, such as Jacob of Edessa's own Hexaemeron.

== Christology ==
Jacob of Serugh held a Miaphysite doctrine. Although he was reluctant to directly engage in the controversies over Christology in his time, his homilies contain some apparent criticisms of Chalcedonian Christianity (that is, the group that accepts the decrees of the Council of Chalcedon) and Jacob accepted reconciliation between the Chalcedonian and non-Chalcedonian positions in Zeno's Henotikon. Despite his ultimately non-Chalcedonian views, his work was nevertheless widely received across Christological confessions, including among Chalcedonian, Maronite, and Church of the East communities, especially given his homilies general avoidance of overtly polemical terminology, and his use of his vehicles as a vehicle for disseminating complex and technical contemporary debates on Christology to wider audiences in simple terms.

A recurring feature of Jacob's Christological language is the pairing of Christ's "miracles and sufferings", a phrase that had become important in post-Chalcedonian controversy through texts such as Leo's Tome and the emperor Zeno's Henotikon. Jacob used this pairing to affirm that the same Christ performed divine acts and underwent human sufferings, while rejecting interpretations that he regarded as dividing Christ into two. Forness identifies four homilies in particular as especially important in showing how Jacob incorporated post-Chalcedonian Christological debate into biblical exposition and catechetical preaching: the Homily on the Council of Chalcedon, the Homily on the Faith, the Homily on "The Lord will Raise a Prophet", and the Homily on the Revelation that Simon Received.

== Political affairs ==
Towards the end of his life, the fate of Miaphysite leaders such as himself took a turn for the worse with the accession of Justin I (r. 518–527) to the throne of the Byzantine Empire. In response to these affairs, Jacob composed two letters and they were composed in the following context. First, on March 28, 519, Justin adopted a pro-Chalcedonian text known as the Formula of Faith which had been written by Pope Hormisdas a few years beforehand, in 515. However, Paul of Edessa, the bishop of Edessa, refused to sign the text, which led Justin to lay siege to the city in November. Paul was exiled, but after forty days was allowed to be let back into the city in December. Immediately thereafter, Jacob wrote his Letter 32 to Paul. In it, he called Paul a "confessor", a title reserved for those who were persecuted but not killed for their faith. Jacob believed that Paul's refusal to sign the text was correct. After a military leader named Patricius invaded Edessa to, Jacob then composed his Letter 35 to the military leader of the city, Bessas. Bessas is praised for his faith which has helped to exalt the city. Jacob recognizes the suffering Bessas had endured for his faith as well and compares him with Abgar of Edessa, the man credited with introducing Christianity to Edessa. To some surprise, aside from praising these two, Jacob also praised the faith of Justin in his letter to Paul: for allowing Paul to return to the city, by comparing him to Abgar, by describing his crown which displays features of the cross of Jesus, and more.

Another affair that Jacob became somewhat involved in was during the persecutions of the Christian community of Najran under the Jewish Himyarite king Dhu Nuwas, which had caused widespread reactions in the world of Syriac Christianity. Between 518 and 521, Jacob composed his Letter to the Himyarites to help extol them for their faith and their endurance. This text is also the only extant literary composition that was sent into pre-Islamic Arabia.

== Reception and memory ==
Sa'id bar Sabuni (d. 1095) wrote an 1106-line metrical homily in his honor, called The Vita of Jacob of Serugh, performed in order to commemorate the day of his death on November 29. Many more lives/Vitas were written for Jacob's memory, like Habib of Edessa's On Jacob of Serugh.

Jacob's reputation as an author and composer also led many to write new works in his name, a famous example being the Song of Alexander.

== Quranic studies ==
Historians have long observed that the Quran presents versions of biblical and biblically related stories that differ from, or even do not appear in, the Bible. In recent years, Syriac Christianity has been identified as key intermediary and link, showing that the differences between the two texts slowly emerged during Late Antiquity, especially within circles of Syriac Christians. The homilies of Jacob of Serugh, in specific, typically contain some of the closest versions of ideas and narratives compared with those in the Quran, the scripture of Islam, which has made them an increasingly important primary source in field of Quranic studies. Key examples include narrative and eschatology and apocalypse.

== Works ==
Jacob is famous for his metrical homilies, written in 12-syllable (dodecasyllabic) verse. According to Bar Hebraeus, Jacob composed over 760 homilies. About 400 have survived, and almost all have appeared in critical editions, primarily in the 6-volume Bedjan-Brock edition (1905–10, 2006) and the 2-volume Akhrass-Syryany edition (2017). A complete numbered list of Jacob's extant homilies was published in Akhrass 2015. As of 2018, 20% of the homilies in the Bedjan-Brock edition have been translated. An ongoing translation project by Gorgias Press aims to bring his entire corpus into English.

Jacob also wrote outside of the genre of metrical homily. Jacob wrote stanzaic poetry (with 25 translated to date), prose homily (8 extant), and other prose works like letters.

=== Manuscripts ===
Jacob's homilies are found in a substantial number of surviving manuscripts. The earliest are from the sixth and seventh centuries, and massive manuscripts have also been recovered produced in the eleventh-thirteenth centuries containing up to two hundred of Jacob's homilies. A distinct transmission of manuscripts of Jacob's writings also permeated monastic circles.

=== Critical editions ===
==== Poetry ====
All ~400 of the poems of Jacob of Serugh have, today, appeared in published critical editions. Paul Bedjan and Sebastian Brock have, together, published critical editions of 211 of Jacob's homilies across six volumes of work.

- Volume 1: Homilies 1–32 (Bedjan)
- Volume 2: Homilies 33–70 (Bedjan)
- Volume 3: Homilies 71–107 (Bedjan)
- Volume 4: Homilies 108–146 (Bedjan)
- Volume 5: Homilies 147–195 (Bedjan)
- Volume 6: Homilies 196–206 (Bedjan), 207–211 (Brock)

The first five volumes were produced by Bedjan between 1905–1910. In 2006, Brock collected critical editions by Bedjan of a few scattered remaining homilies, and added some of his own, to produce the sixth volume. All six volumes can now be accessed in a single six-volume set by Gorgias Press.

- Mar Jacobus Sarugensis (1905). Paulus Bedjan (ed.). Homilae selectae Mar-Jacobi Sarugensis (in Syriac and French). Paris: Otto Harrassowitz.
- Homilies of Mar Jacob of Sarug (6-volume set)

Miscellaneous contributions by other authors over the years (including Albert, Stothman, Mouterde, Alwan, and others) raised the total to 243 homilies with critical editions.

In 2017, critical editions were published for Jacob's remaining 160 homilies by Roger Akhrass and Imad Syryany.

- Roger Akhrass and Imad Syryany, 160 Unpublished Homilies of Jacob of Serugh, 2 vols., Damascus: Department of Syriac Studies

==== Prose ====
In total, Jacob is known to have written 43 letters (prose works). A critical edition of all letters was published in 1952 by Gunnar Olinder.

- Iacobus Sarugensis (1952). G Olinder (ed.). Iacobi Sarugensis epistulae quotquot supersunt. Corpus scriptorum Christianorum Orientalium, Scriptores Syri, v. 57. Louvain.

=== Translations ===
Manuscripts of Jacob's homilies are also found in multiple languages beyond Syriac to which they were translated, including Coptic, Georgian, Armenian, Arabic, and Ethiopic. The number of Jacob's works translated into Arabic number over one hundred, and there are over two hundred Armenian manuscripts of them that date from the twelfth to twentieth centuries.

In modern-times, Behnam Sony has composed a five-volume translation of Jacob's writings into Arabic.

In European languages, Jacob's writings have been widely translated into English, German, French, and Italian.

From the eighteenth century onwards, new discoveries of manuscripts of Jacob's works have sparked no less than three debates over his Christology.

=== List of translations ===
==== Homilies on specific figures ====
- Mary, mother of Jesus — Jacob of Serug (1998). Mary Hansbury (ed.). On the Mother of God. Crestwood, New York, US: St. Vladimir's Seminary Press. ISBN 0-88141-184-1. Also — Giacomo de Sarug (1953). Constantino Vona (ed.). Omelie mariologiche. Lateranum: nova ser., an. 19, n. 1-4 (in Italian). Rome: Facultas Theologica Pontificii Athenaei Lateranensis.
- Women whom Jesus met — Susan Ashbrook Harvey; Sebastian P. Brock; Reyhan Durmaz; Rebecca Stephens Falcasantos; Michael Payne; Daniel Picus, eds. (2016). Jacob of Sarug's homilies on the Women whom Jesus Met. Texts from Christian Late Antiquity. Vol. 44. Piscataway, N. J.: Gorgias Press. ISBN 978-1-4632-0580-5.
- Veil of Moses — Brock, Sebastian Paul (1981). "Jacob of Serugh on the Veil of Moses". Sobornost'/Eastern Churches Review. 3 (1): 70–85.
- Ephrem the Syrian — Jacob of Sarug (1995). Joseph P Amar (ed.). A metrical homily on holy Mar Ephrem. Patrologia Orientalis; t. 47, fasc. 1. Turnhout: Brepols.
- Simeon Stylites — Harvey, Susan Ashbrook (1990). "Memra on Simeon the Stylite". In Vincent L Wimbush (ed.). Ascetic behavior in Greco-Roman antiquity: a sourcebook. Minneapolis: Fortress. pp. 15–28. ISBN 0-8006-3105-6.
- Thomas the Apostle — Jakob von Sarug (1976). Werner Strothmann (ed.). Drei Gedichte über den Apostel Thomas in Indien. Göttinger Orientforschungen I Reihe, Syriaca; Bd 12. Wiesbaden: Harrassowitz. ISBN 3-447-01720-1.
- Melchizedek — Thokeparampil, J (1993). "Memra on Melkizedek". The Harp. 6: 53–64.
- Letters — Bou Mansour, Tanios (1993). La théologie de Jacques de Saroug (in French). Kaslik: Université Saint Esprit.
- Thomas the Apostle in India – Jacob of Serug (2007). D.P. Curtin (ed.). The Palace built by Thomas the Apostle in India. Philadelphia: Dalcassian. ISBN 9798869093387.
- Aaron the High Priest — Heal, Kristian (2022). Jacob of Sarug's Homily on Aaron the Priest. Gorgias Press.
- Abgar and Addai — Gibson, Kelli (2022). Jacob of Sarug's Homilies on Abgar and Addai. Gorgias Press.
- Samson — Miller, Dana (2021). Jacob of Sarug's Homily on Samson. Gorgias Press.
- Paul — Hansbury, Mary; Parakkott, Raja (2021). Jacob of Sarug's Homilies on Paul. Gorgias Press.
- Jonah and the Ninevites — Translation of a partial Armenian translation of a now-lost fuller homily by Jacob. Hilkens, Andy (2024). "An Armenian Invocational Prayer of a Now Lost Homily of Jacob of Serugh on Jonah and the Ninevites". Journal of Theological Studies. doi:10.1093/jts/flae003.

==== Homilies on creation ====
- Four homilies on creation. Jaques de Saroug (1989). Khalil Alwan (ed.). Quatre homélies métriques sur la création. Corpus scriptorum Christianorum Orientalium. Scriptores Syri. 0070-0452; t.214, 215 (in French). Leuven: Peeters.
- Homily on the seven days of creation translated by Edward G. Mathews Jr.:
  - First day: Jacob of Sarug's homilies on the six days of creation. The first day. Gorgias Press. 2009. ISBN 978-1607243236.
  - Second day of creation. Jacob of Sarug's homilies on the six days of creation. The second day. Gorgias Press. 2016.
  - Third day. Jacob of Sarug's homilies on the six days of creation. The third day. Gorgias Press. 2016.
  - Fourth day. Jacob of Sarug's homilies on the six days of creation. The fourth day. Gorgias Press. 2018.
  - Fifth day. Jacob of Sarug's homilies on the six days of creation. The fifth day. Gorgias Press. 2019.
  - Sixth day. Jacob of Sarug's homilies on the six days of creation. The sixth day. Gorgias Press. 2020.
  - Seventh day. Jacob of Sarug's homilies on the six days of creation. The seventh day. Gorgias Press. 2021.
- Jacob of Serugh's Hexaemeron. Muraoka, T (2018). Jacob of Serugh's Hexaemeron. Peeters.

==== Other homilies ====
- Prose homilies (turgame) — Jacques de Saroug (1986). Frédéric Rilliet (ed.). Six homélies festales en prose. Patrologia Orientalis; t. 43, fasc. 4 (in French). Turnhout: Brepols.
- Stanzaic poetry — Brock, Sebastian (2022). The Stanzaic Poems of Jacob of Serugh: A Collection of His Madroshe and Sughyotho. Gorgias Press.
- Prayers — Hansbury, Mary (2015). The Prayers of Jacob of Serugh. SLG Press.
- Seven homilies against the Jews, of which the sixth takes the form of a dispute (ܣܓܝܬܐ sāḡiṯâ) between personifications of the Synagogue and the Church — Jacques de Saroug (1976). Micheline Albert (ed.). Homélies contre les Juifs. Patrologia Orientalis; t. 38, fasc. 1 (in French). Turnhout: Brepols.
- On the dominical feasts — Jacob of Serugh (1997). Thomas Kollamparampil (ed.). Select festal homilies. Bangalore and Rome: Dharmaram and Centre for Indian and Inter-Religious Studies.
- Concerning the red heifer — Alibertis, Demetrios (2022). Jacob of Sarug's Homily Concerning the Red Heifer and the Crucifixion of our Lord. Gorgias Press.
- God's love towards humanity and the just — Sirgy, Dominique (2022). Jacob of Sarug's Homily on the Love of God towards Humanity and of the Just towards God. Gorgias Press.
- Seeking above outer darkness — Sirgy, Dominique (2022). Jacob of Sarug's Homily on Paul's Word to Seek What is Above and on Outer Darkness. Gorgias Press.
- Edessa and Jerusalem — Loopstra, Jonathan (2021). Jacob of Sarug's Homily on Edessa and Jerusalem. Gorgias Press.

== List of homilies ==
Homilies of Jacob of Serugh (numbering of Akhrass 2015)
Number	Name
1	Admonition
2	On Sinai
3	Consecration of Church and Moses
4	Bronze serpent
5	Aaron
6	Star of Magi, Innocents
7	Three Baptisms
8	Baptism of Christ
9	Baptism
10	Lord’s prayer
11	Matthew 19: 16
12	Prodigal son
13	Pharisee and Publican
14	Workers in Vineyard
15	Zacchaeus
16	Dives and Lazarus
17	Canaanite woman
18	Palm Sunday
19	“Who do people say I am?”
20	Get thee behind me, Satan
21	Denial of Peter
22	Departed
23	Fast, 1
24	Fast, 2
25	Fast, 3
26	Love
27	Admonition
28	Repentance
29	Repentance and admonition
30	Matthew 16: 26
31	End
32	End and Judgement
33	Tower of Babel
34	David and Goliath
35	Elisha’s bones
36	Daniel 2, Daniel and Companions
37	Annunciation to Zechariah
38	John 1:1
39	Only-Begotten Word
40	Emmanuel
41	Psalm 110: 4
42	Reception of Mysteries
43	Christ as food and drink
44	Leper
45	Healing of centurion’s son
46	Samaritan woman
47	Man who fell among thieves
48	Three dead persons raised by our Lord
49	Transfiguration
50	Ten virgins
51	Sinful woman whose sins were forgiven
52	Thief on right hand
53	Crucifixion
54	Resurrection
55	Resurrection
56	Martyrs
57	New Sunday and Thomas
58	Pentecost
59	Matthew 19: 27
60	John the Evangelist
61	Paul, 1
62	Paul, 2
63	Love of God
64	Pride
65	Haughtiness
66	Love of poor
67	End
68	End and judgment
69	Departed, 6
70	Consolation for priests
71	Creation
72	Creation of Adam
73	Blessings of Isaac
74	Jacob at Bethel
75	On our Lord and Jacob, and on Rachel and the Church, and on Leah and the Synagogue
76	Two sparrows
77	Red Heifer
78	Two Goats
79	Veil of Moses
80	Symbols of Christ
81	Christ’s 30 years
82	Our Lord and Satan
83	Beatitudes
84	Do not swear
85	‘Foxes have their holes…’
86	Kingdom as leaven
87	Five loaves and two fishes
88	Blind Timaeus
89	Widow’s mites
90	Prodigal son
91	Jairus’ daughter
92	Widow of Nain’s son resuscitated
93	Raising of Lazarus
94	Faith
95	Reception of Mysteries
96	Beheading of John the Baptist
97	John the Baptist
98	Stephen
99	Thomas
100	Thomas’ castle in India
101	Fall of idols
102	Against drunkenness
103	Love of money
104	Vanity of vanities
105	Col 3:1–2
106	Psalm 148
107	Morning and evening praise
108	Flood
109	Abraham and his types
110	‘The Lord will raise up a prophet…’
111	Judgement of Solomon
112	Elijah, 2 (Elijah’s flight from Jezebel)
113	Elijah, 3 (Naboth)
114	Elijah, 4
115	Ascension of Elijah
116	Elisha, 1
117	Elisha, 2
118	Elisha, 3 (Elisha and Shunamite)
119	Elisha, 4
120	Elisha, 5
121	Elisha, 6
122	Jonah
123	Daniel 1, Daniel and Nebuchadnezzar
124	Daniel, 3
125	On the Chariot that Ezekiel saw
126	Temptation of Christ
127	Kingdom as mustard seed
128	Camel and needle’s eye
129	Miracles of our Lord
130	Man with legion of demons
131	Paralytic aged 38
132	Cursed fig tree
133	Parable of Vineyard
134	Consecration of Church
135	Assembly of bishops
136	Single Lawgiver of OT and NT
137	Solitaries, 1
138	Solitaries, 2
139	Praise at table, 1
140	Praise at table, 2
141	Praise at table, 3
142	Praise at table, 4
143	Praise at table, 5
144	Praise at table, 6
145	Praise at table, 7
146	Praise at table, 8
147	Cain and Abel, 1
148	Cain and Abel, 2
149	Cain and Abel, 3
150	Cain and Abel, 4
151	Sodom, 1
152	Sodom, 2
153	Sodom, 3
154	Sodom, 4
155	Melkizedek and symbols of our Lord
156	Job 7:7
157	Job
158	Moses’ extended hands
159	Jephtha’s daughter
160	Samson, 1
161	Samson, 2
162	King David and Uriah
163	King Uzziah and Isaiah
164	Ezekiel and torrent
165	Presentation in Temple
166	Luke 2: 34
167	Miracle at Cana
168	Treasure in field
169	Luke 13:11
170	Sick woman
171	Matthew 22:2
172	Woman with seven husbands
173	Five talents
174	Entry of Jerusalem
175	Passover in the Law
176	Death and Satan
177	Cherub and Thief
178	Third appearance of Christ
179	Lame man healed by Simon and John
180	Edessa and Jerusalem
181	George
182	Admonition
183	Departed, 2
184	Departed
185	Consolation for the departed (Departed, 7)
186	Consolation for the departed (Departed, 3)
187	Departed, 5
188	Departed, 8
189	Departed children
190	Departed
191	Departed Daughter of Covenant
192	End, 1
193	End, 2
194	End, 4
195	End, 5
196	Mary
197	Annunciation
198	Visitation
199	Mary’s virginity
200	Death of Virgin
201	Nativity
202	Nativity, 2
203	Nativity
204	Ascension
205	Virginity
206	Council of Nicaea
207	Thamar
208	Conversion of Antioch
209	Constantine
210	Sleepers of Ephesus
211	Chalcedon
212	Mary and Golgotha
213	Strangers
214	Spectacles of the Theatre
215	Prophet Hosea
216	Thomas, 2
217	Thomas, 3
218	Against Jews, 1
219	Against Jews, 2
220	Against Jews, 3
221	Against Jews, 4
222	Against Jews, 5
223	Against Jews, 6
224	Against Jews, 7
225	Priesthood and altar
226	Alexander
227	Gen. 1:26 and Nativity
228	Adam created mortal or immortal
229	Adam’s expulsion from Paradise
230	Body and soul
231	Edessa
232	[Fragment]
233	Sharbel
234	Shmona and Gurya
235	Habib
236	Ephrem
237	Symeon the Stylite
238	Sergius and Bacchus
239	Forty Martyrs of Sebaste
240	Departed
241	Annunciation
242	Elijah, 1
243	Myron
244	On Isaiah 9: 6
245	Christ’s incomprehensibility and against Diphysites
246	Nativity
247	Nativity
248	Martyrion of St Stephen made into a fire shrine when they entered Amid
249	‘Are you the one who comes…?’
250	Juliana Saba
251	Repentance, 3
252	Peter’s coin from the fish
253	Christ walking on water
254	On the deaf, blind and possessed
255	Palm Sunday
256	Symbols of our Lord in OT
257	Crucifixion
258	Crucifixion
259	On Matthew 12: 43
260	Crucifixion, 4
261	Crucifixion, 2
262	Church and Crucifixion
263	Crucifixion, 6
264	The two thieves
265	Crucifixion, 7 (Burial of Christ)
266	Christ’s Descent to Sheol
267	Moses’ extended hands
268	Finding of the Cross
269	Resurrection of our Lord
270	Guard of soldiers and resurrection
271	Ananias and Sapphira
272	Abgar
273	Addai and Abgar
274	Apostles
275	Conversion of Rome by Peter
276	Martyrs (in general)
277	Zacchaeus, apostle and bishop of Myra
278	Abhai
279	Dimet
280	Laurentios, Agrippas and their 12000 companions
281	On Barsauma
282	Patron saint
283	Maccabean Martyrs
284	Thomas, 7:7
285	Burial of Moses
286	Burial of priests
287	Departed, 1
288	Departed, 4
289	Departed, 9
290	The End, 1 and on Ezekiel’s vision
291	The End, 7
292	The End, 9
293	The End, 10 (Antichrist)
294	End, 10
295	Kingdom and Gehenna
296	Praise at table, 9
297	Admonition and plague of locusts
298	Evening praise
299	Night praise
300	Morning praise, 1
301	Morning praise, 2
302	Praise with the lamp’s light
303	Praise with the incense smoke
304	Betrothal of Rebecca
305	Jacob’s rods
306	Joseph, 1
307	Joseph, 2
308	Joseph, 3
309	Joseph, 4
310	Joseph, 5
311	Joseph, 6
312	Joseph, 7
313	Joseph, 8
314	Joseph, 9
315	Joseph, 10
316	Moses, 1
317	Moses, 2 (Moses and Burning Bush)
318	Moses, 3
319	Moses, 4 (Moses and Exodus)
320	Moses, 5 (Moses and water of Marah)
321	Moses, 6 (Moses and manna and the rock)
322	Moses, 9 (Adultery of Synagogue)
323	Sacrifices
324	Separation of foods
325	Balaam and Balak
326	On the blessed Phinehas who prayed and kept back the plague
327	Joshua and on the Mysteries of our Lord and his Church
328	On Rahab the harlot
329	On Achan son of Carmi
330	On Gideon
331	On the Ark of the Covenant, when the Philistines took it (1 Samuel 4–7)
332	On Uzzah when he stayed the ark of God
333	David and Uriah
334	David, 3 (On that which is said: “And the anger of the Lord was against Israel and he incited David”, 2 Samuel 24:1)
335	King Asa
336	Daniel 4, Daniel and Belshazzar
337	Daniel 5, Daniel in the lions’ den
338	Faith, 2
339	Faith, 4
340	Faith, 6
341	Faith, 7 (Body of Christ passible before resurrection)
342	Faith, 8
343	Faith, 10
344	Parable of ten coins and hundred sheep
345	Admonition, against blasphemers
346	The complaint of the poor
347	Reprimand
348	1 Timothy 2: 5
349	Ga 6: 14
350	Day and night, work and rest
351	Destruction of Amid
352	Destruction of Jerusalem
353	[Untitled]
354	Supplication while he was still young
355	On Joseph
356	General eulogy
357	Beginning of Lent
358	On Sabbat
359	Canaanite woman
360	On the boat
361	On the man who had a withered hand
362	Crucifixion
363	Passion of our Lord
364	Crucifixion
365	Saturday of Annunciation
366	Sunday of resurrection
367	For the fourth Sunday after resurrection
368	For the fifth Sunday after resurrection
369	For the seventh Sunday after resurrection
370	For the eighth Sunday after resurrection
371	On Holy Mary, Mother of God
372	On Repentance
373	Theodore
374	On saints
375	On Friday of confessors and martyrs
376	On priests
377	On deacons
378	On strangers
379	On the resurrection of the repentants
380	On Women
381	Consolation for departed
382	Hour of death
383	Petition on the crucifixion of our Lord
384	Meeting of the apostles at the departure of their Lord’s Mother
385	Virgin Mary
386	[Fragment]
387	[Fragment]
388	Love of world and faith
389	Satan
390	On excommunication
391	Against Nestorius
392	Behnam I
393	Behnam II
394	Orthodox faith
395	Dispensation of the Word
396	Morning hymn (heptasyllabic)
397	Mt 13, 47
398	On the Bell Clapper, Concerning the Admonition to Prayer
399	On lack of rain
400	Fragment of an unidentified mimro
401	On admonition
402	Finding of Cross
403	Repentance and blame of soul and body
404	Admonition (Prose Homily)
405	Admonition (Prose Homily)
406	On humility
407	On the soul of man
408	Sacrifices of Jews and Armenians

== See also ==
- Eastern Christianity
- Letter to the Himyarites
- Oriental Orthodoxy
- Romanos the Melodist
