= Reyhan Durmaz =

Turkish religious studies scholar

Reyhan Durmaz is a Turkish religious studies scholar and assistant professor of religious studies at the University of Pennsylvania.

== Biography ==
Reyhan Durmaz was born in April 1984 in Turkey. She earned her B.A. from Middle East Technical University in 2007, followed by an M.A. from Koc University in 2010 and another M.A. from Central European University in 2012. She received her Ph.D. from Brown University in 2019.

== Selected works ==
- Jacob of Sarug's Homilies on Women Whom Jesus Met (co-ed. 2016)
- Stories between Christianity and Islam: Saints, Memory, and Cultural Exchange in Late Antiquity and Beyond (University of California Press, 2022)
