= Aristobulus of Alexandria =

2nd century BC Hellenistic Jewish philosopher of the Peripatetic school

Aristobulus of Alexandria (Greek: Ἀριστόβουλος) also called Aristobulus the Peripatetic (fl. c. 181–124 BC) and once believed to be Aristobulus of Paneas, was a Hellenistic Jewish philosopher of the Peripatetic school, though he also used Platonic, Pythagorean, and Stoic concepts. Like his successor, Philo, he attempted to fuse ideas in the Hebrew Scriptures with those in Greek thought.

== History ==
He lived in the third or 2nd century BC. The period of his life is doubtful : Alfred Gercke places him in the time of Ptolemy Lathyrus (latter part of 2nd century BC); reliable testimony indicates that he was a contemporary of Ptolemy Philometor (middle of 2nd century BC).

Aristobulus was among many philosophers of his day who argued that the essentials of Greek philosophy and metaphysics were derived from Jewish sources. Philosopher Numenius of Apamea (2nd century AD) echoes this position in his well-known statement "What is Plato but Moses speaking Attic Greek?" (1.150.4) Aristobulus maintained, 150 years earlier than Philo, that not only the oldest Grecian poets, Homer, Hesiod, Orpheus, etc., but also the most celebrated Greek thinkers, especially Plato, had acquired most of their wisdom from Jewish sages and ancient Hebrew texts (Gfrorer i. p. 308, also ii. 111–118) (Eusebius citing Aristobulus and Numenius Ev ix. 6, xi. 10).

He was among the earliest of the Jewish Alexandrian philosophers whose aim was to reconcile and identify Greek philosophical conceptions with the Jewish religion. Only a few fragments of his work, apparently entitled Commentaries on the Writings of Moses, are quoted by Clement, Eusebius and other theological writers, but they suffice to show its object. Fragment 1 survived in Eusebius' Ecclesiastica Historia (book 7, chapter 32), while Praeparatio Evangelica (book 8, chapter 10, and book 13, chapter 12) has preserved fragments 2–5, and, more particularly, two fair-sized fragments of it, in which are found all the quotations from Aristobulus made by Clement. Parallels to parts of fragments 2–5 are found in Stromata, books 1, 5, and 6. In addition, there is extant a small passage concerning the time of the Passover festival, quoted by Anatolius. In addition, Aristobulus is the author of the first recorded Hexaemeron, although it has been lost.

He claimed that the anthropomorphisms of God contained in the Septuagint should be explained as allegories of the qualities of God. Aristobulus reconciled these passages with God's transcendence by arguing that God was both transcendent and imminent simultaneously. Supposing that God was transcendent in His being and imminent in His power allowed Aristobulus to explain the Septuagint anthropomorphisms as expressions of only one part of the entire character of God, his power, while also supporting God's transcendence.

== Incorrect or heterodox descriptions ==
He is incorrectly named "Aristobulus of Paneas" in Rufinus' Latin translation of Eusebius' Historia Ecclesiastica (7, 32, 16). It is a wrong translation of the Greek ὁ πάνυ, "the Great". In addition, the author here quoted by Eusebius, Anatolius of Laodicea (270 AD), was mistaken in believing that Aristobulus was one of the 70 priests who translated the Old Testament into Greek (the Septuagint) during the reign of Ptolemy II Philadelphus (3rd century BC). Anatolius of Laodicea incorrectly said that he lived in the time of Ptolemy Philadelphus.

A further mistake in Rufinus' Latin translation of the Anatolius fragment gave rise to the legend that Aristobulus was from Paneas, in the Golan Heights. He is the author of a book the exact title of which is not certain, although there is sufficient evidence to prove that it was an exposition of the Law of Moses.

Aristobulus endeavoured to prove that early Greek philosophers had from Linus, Orpheus, Musaeus and others, passages which strongly resemble the Mosaic writings. It is suggested that the name Aristobulus was taken from 2 Macc 1:10. The hypothesis that it was from Aristobulus that the philosophy of the Wisdom of Sirach was derived is not generally accepted.
