= De opificio mundi =

1st-century commentary on Genesis creation narrative

The De opificio mundi (On the Creation of the Cosmos) is a treatise on the Genesis creation narrative, composed by the Jewish philosopher Philo of Alexandria some time between 30 and 40 AD. It belongs to the Hexaemeral genre of literature, and is the first surviving example of it, though earlier, albeit lost Hexaemeral works, also existed. One such example by Aristobulus of Alexandria was an inspiration for Philo's own work.

Since Turnebus's 1552 edition, the Opificio has appeared first in nearly all collections of Philo's works. Only his Legum allegoriae is more popular. It has drawn an audience for many reasons, including its dedication to the topic of the creation period, its novel monotheistic reading of the Timaeus by Plato (subsequently adopted by the Church Fathers and in Christian Platonism), and its development of Logos theology. Philo also wrote some similar works to the Opificio, including his Allegorical Commentary on Genesis and his Questions and Answers on Genesis and Exodus, for which the Opificio served as an opening treatise.

== Influences ==
Philo was working within an existing Jewish tradition of commentary and exegesis of the books of Moses, such as the earlier (and now lost) writings of Aristobulus of Alexandria. Philo also cites some of his colleagues as well as earlier philosophers like Plato, although he rarely refers to them and, when he does, usually not by name. Baudouin Decharneux has argued that Philo's doctrine of divine powers (δυναμεις) was influenced equally by biblical and Greek (primarily Platonic) ideas.

Because many of the works Philo relied on are now lost, the Opificio, along with the rest of his surviving oeuvre, is used to help reconstruct those earlier traditions.

== Genre ==
In subsequent writings, Philo calls the Opificio a συνταξις, or an "ordered composition", a didactic or systematic prose work. His work is also considered to be a commentary on the books of Moses. It is also one of a broader set of works by Philo referred to as the Exposition of the Law. The Exposition was a tripartite project, with the Opificio being its first part on the topic of creation, followed by a second part on history, and a third part on legislation.

== Structure ==
According to Runia, the structure of Philo's Opificio can be divided into twenty-five chapters as follows (with the symbol §§ denoting the term "sections"):

- §§1–6. Introduction.
- §§7–12. Preliminary comments on God and the cosmos.
- §§13–15a. Comments that the six days are not literal but simply denote the order of creation.
- §§15b–25. Day one.
- §§26–28. Comments that "In the beginning" refers to what God did first, as the first temporal moment.
- §§29–35. Seven main components of the cosmos according to Gen 1:1–3.
- §§35–37. Second day.
- §§38–44. Third day.
- §§45–52. Fourth day: comments on the relationship between the number of the day (four) and what was created on this day.
- §§53–61. Fourth day: the creation events.
- §§62–68. Fifth day.
- §§69–71. Comments on why man is made in God's image.
- §§72–76. Why did God use helpers to create (according to Gen 1:26)?
- §§77–88. Why was man made last?
- §§89–128. The relationship between the Sabbath and the number seven.
- §§129–130. Summarizing reflection on Gen 2:4–5a.
- §§131–133. On the separation of fresh water from salt water.
- §§134–135. On the making of man from the Earth.
- §§136–147. The excellence of the first human being.
- §§148–150. Man naming the animals.
- §§151–152. The origins of woman and the quest for bodily pleasure.
- §§153–156. Interpretation of events in the garden.
- §§157–166. Interpretation of the snake.
- §§167–170a. The consequence of wickedness.
- §§170b–172. Moses teaches five vital lessons.

== Translations and commentaries ==
- Douwe Runia, Philo of Alexandria, On the Creation of the Cosmos according to Moses Introduction: Translation and Commentary, Brill, 2001.

== See also ==
- On the Origin of the World
