= Gerasimos, Abbot of the Monastery of Saint Symeon =

Gerasimos (or Gerasimus) was a Christian apologist and monk who wrote in Arabic. He lived in the Middle Ages, sometime between the 9th and 13th centuries.

== Life ==
Virtually nothing is known of Gerasimos' biography. His only surviving work provides no information beyond what is indicated by the long title: that he was the abbot of the Greek Orthodox monastery of the Blessed Saint Symeon the Wonderworker outside of Antioch. He may have been a native of Antioch. Even his dates are unknown. He cannot have been writing earlier than the 9th century, since he cites the work of Theodore Abū Qurra, who died around 820. Nor can he have been writing later than 1268, when the monastery of Saint Symeon was destroyed by Sultan Baybars during his campaign against Antioch. It was never restored. The earliest surviving manuscript of his work dates to the 13th century. Most authorities place his writing in the 12th or 13th century, not long before the destruction of the monastery, as there are no earlier references to his work.

Since Gerasimos was a rare name in Syria between the 9th and 13th centuries, several identifications with other known figures have been suggested for the author and apologist. Samuel Noble and Alexander Treiger suggest that the author may be Gerasimos, the "spiritual son" to whom Nikon of the Black Mountain addressed a letter, which he includes in his Taktikon. The subject of the letter is the Christianization of Georgia and Nikon was a monk at Saint Symeon from about 1060 until 1084. Abgar Bahkou and John Lamoreaux suggest that the apologist may be the scribe Gerasimos who lived in the monastery in the 13th century and worked on a manuscript containing the biographies of Saint Symeon the Wonderworker and his mother, the Blessed Martha.

Although his work provides no biographical details, it does show that Gerasimos received a good and broad education. He was familiar with Aristotelian logic as well as with pagan and Muslim authors. He is included as a saint in the synaxarion of Patriarch Makarios III of Antioch (died 1672) and in the patriarch's Kitāb al-naḥla (Book of the Bee).

== Works ==
According to the synaxarion of Makarios III, Gerasimos wrote works called al-Mujādalāt (The Disputations), al-Mawaʿīẓ (The Sermons) and al-Shāfī (The Healer). Only the last work survives. Its full title is al-Kāfī fī l-maʿnā l-shāfī. It is written in Arabic and divided into five parts, the last being far longer than the rest. It is detailed, learned, gracious and bereft of the rancor that came to characterize Christian apologia under Islam in the later Middle Ages.

In parts 1 and 2, Gerasimos discusses the nature of the true religion. Its purpose, he says, is to draw humans to God through commands and prohibitions and through the promise of reward or punishment in the afterlife. Further, it must be universal, not tribal, and communicable in language the people can understand. It must also be confirmed by miracles. He argues that all religions save Christianity draw humanity to earthly glory and serve its base desires. Of all the religions he knows, only Christianity is truly universal and accessible.

In parts 3 and 4, Gerasimos marshals "testimonies" in support of his views. He cites first Christian sources (Old and New Testament); then Jewish (such as Josephus); then contemporary pagan, that is, the writings of the Sabians of Ḥarrān; then ancient Greek philosophers (such as Socrates, Plato, Aristotle and Hermes Trismegistos); and finally a Muslim source, the Qurʾān.

In part 5, Gerasimos deals with six objections. The first objection states that Christianity cannot be the true religion because it is not the largest, has not always existed and is sometimes held in contempt. The next three objections are philosophical and allege the incompatibility of Christian doctrines (such as the Trinity and Incarnation) with reason, or the contradictoriness of others (such as divine foreknowledge and omnibenevolence). The final two objections target the Christian view of revelation and law.

Gerasimos has answers to all the objections. He argues that "the ascendancy of the umma of Muḥammad" and "the sword of Islam" are meant to discipline God's true children; that God's true nature demanded atonement rather than salvation by fiat; and that God reveals his law progressively as humanity passes through different stages of maturity. Thus the law of Christ supersedes the law of Moses, which supersedes the natural law.

Al-Kāfī fī l-maʿnā l-shāfī or portions of it are (or were) preserved in 23 manuscripts, not all of them traceable today. Only four of them are earlier than the 17th century:

- Sinai, Monastery of Saint Catherine, MS Ar. 448 (Kamil 495), folios 100^{v}–127^{r}, from the 13th century, contains only part 1
- Sinai, Monastery of Saint Catherine, MS Ar. 451 (Kamil 497), from 1323, contains only part 3
- Paris, Bibliothèque nationale de France, MS Ar. 258, folios 73–78, from the 15th century, contains only the "testimonies" of the ancient Greeks
- Beirut, Bibliothèque Orientale, MS 548, pages 243–271, from the 16th century, contains only the "testimonies" of the ancient Greeks and the Qurʾān

== Bibliography ==
- Bahkou, Abjar; Lamoreaux, John C. (2012). "Gerasimos". In David Thomas; Alex Mallett (eds.). Christian–Muslim Relations: A Bibliographical History. Vol. 4 (1200–1350). Brill. pp. 666–671. (The name of the first author is incorrectly given as Abgar Bakhou.)
- Bahkou, Abjar (2009). "Kitāb al-Kāfī fī al-maʻnā al-šāfī (The Complete Book of the Proper Meaning): The Christian Apology of Gerasimus". Parole de l'Orient. 34: 309–343.
- Bahkou, Abjar, ed. (2014). Defending Christian Faith: The Fifth Part of the Christian Apology of Gerasimus. De Gruyter.
- Khawam, René R., ed. (1996). Gérassime: Dialogues œcuméniques de guérison suivi de Traité sur la Sainte Trinité. L'Esprit des péninsules.
- Nasrallah, Joseph (1972). "Couvents de la Syrie du Nord portant le nom de Siméon". Syria. 49 (Fasc. 1-2): 127–159.
- Nasrallah, Joseph (1979). Histoire du movement littéraire dans l'église melchite du V^{e} au XX^{e} siècle: Contribution à l'étude de la littérature arabe chrétienne. Vol. III, Tome 2: 1250–1516. Peeters.
- Noble, Samuel; Treiger, Alexander (2014). "Introduction". In Samuel Noble; Alexander Treiger (eds.). The Orthodox Church in the Arab World, 700–1700: An Anthology of Sources. Cornell University Press. pp. 3–39.
- Walbiner, Carsten-Michael (2009). "Preserving the Past and Enlightening the Present: Macarius b. al-Zaʿīm and Medieval Melkite Literature". Parole de l'Orient. 34: 433–441.
