= Ibn Butlan =

11th-century Arab Christian physician from Baghdad

Ibn Buṭlān
- ابن بطلان
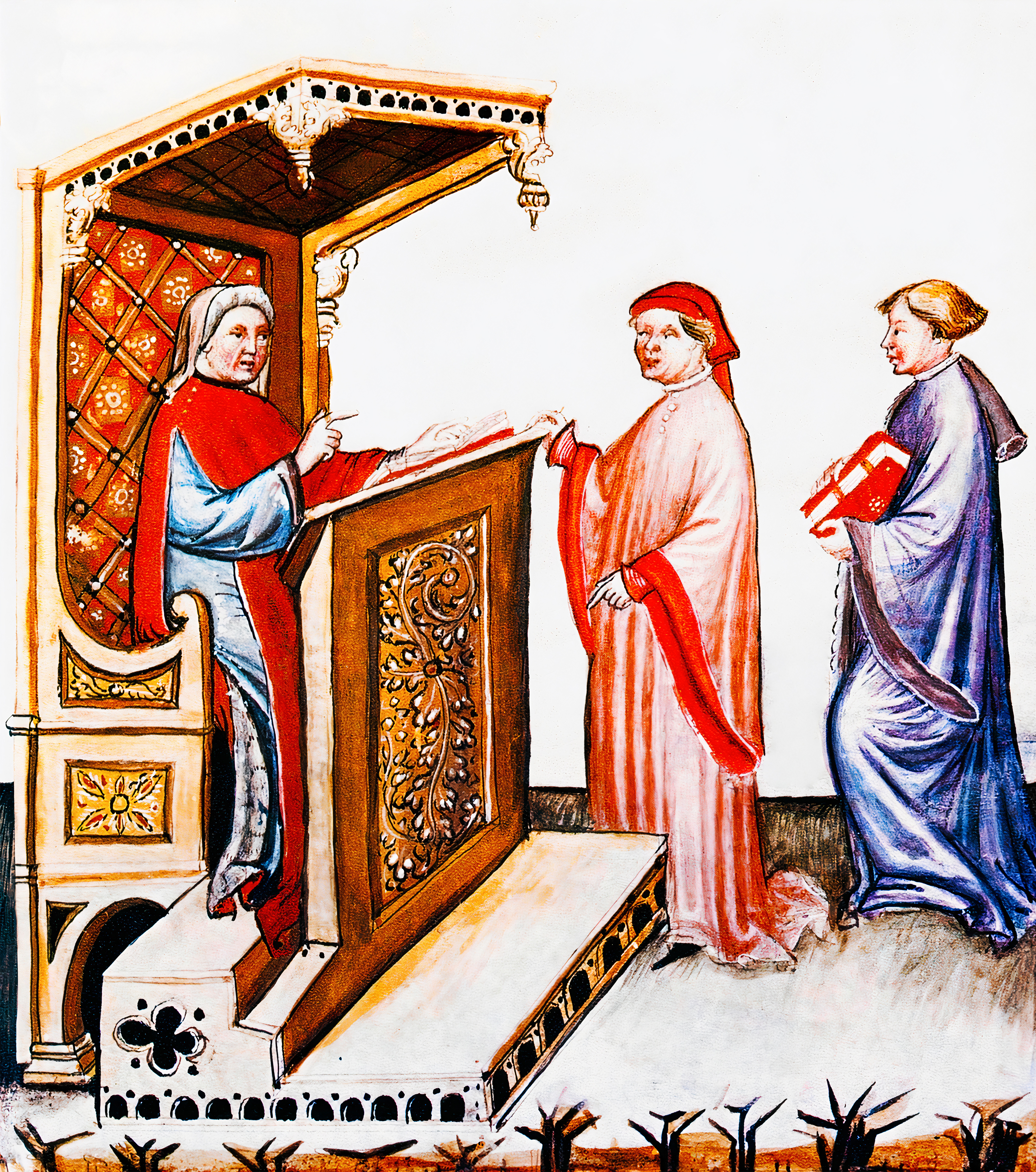
- Ibn Buṭlān (left) and two of his students depicted in the Cod. Vindob. S. N. 2644 edition of the Tacuinum Sanitatis
- Official name: Abū 'l-Ḥasan al-Muḫtār Yuwānnīs ibn al-Ḥasan ibn ʿAbdūn ibn Saʿdūn ibn Buṭlān (أبو الحسن المختار إيوانيس بن الحسن بن عبدون بن سعدون بن بطلان)

Personal life
- Born: c. 1001–1025 Baghdad, Abbasid Caliphate (now Iraq)
- Died: 2 September 1066 (aged 40–66) Antioch on the Orontes, Byzantine Empire (now Turkey)
- Occupation: Author; monk; physician; theologian

Religious life
- Religion: Nestorian Christianity
- Church: Church of the East (initially); Greek Orthodox Patriarchate of Antioch (later)

Senior posting
- Influenced by: Ibn aṭ-Ṭaiyib; Abū Bakr al-Rāzī; Claudius Galenus; Aristotle; Hippocrates; Porphyry; Themistius; Pedanius Dioscorides; Isaac Israeli ben Solomon; Ibn Riḍwān; Avicenna
- Medical career
- Institutions: Al-Bīmāristān al-ʿAḍudī (Baghdad); Monastery of St. Simeon Stylites the Younger (Antioch)
Onomastic information
Arabic name
Personal (Ism)	Al-Muḫtār المختار
Patronymic (Nasab)	Ibn al-Ḥasan ibn ʿAbdūn ibn Saʿdūn ibn Buṭlān بن الحسن بن عبدون بن سعدون بن بطلان
Teknonymic (Kunya)	Abū l-Ḥasan أبو الحسن
Other names	Yuwānnīs إيوانيس

Abū 'l-Ḥasan al-Muḫtār Yuwānnīs ibn al-Ḥasan ibn ʿAbdūn ibn Saʿdūn ibn Buṭlān (Arabic: أبو الحسن المختار إيوانيس بن الحسن بن عبدون بن سعدون بن بطلان; c. 1001 to 1025 – 8 Šauwāl 458 AH or 2 September 1066), commonly known as Ibn Buṭlān (ابن بطلان), was an Arab physician and Nestorian Christian theologian. Born in Baghdad, the erstwhile capital city of the Abbasid Caliphate, he travelled throughout Mesopotamia, Syria, Egypt, and Anatolia, during which time he practiced medicine, studied, wrote, and engaged in intellectual debates—most famously the Battle of the Physicians (Note: Arabic: وقعت الأطباء, romanized: Waqʿat al-Aṭibbāʾ) with the Egyptian polymath Ibn Riḍwān. In 1054, he was in Constantinople, the capital city of the Byzantine Empire, where he witnessed first-hand the East–West Schism among Christendom, contributing a work to the discussions surrounding it for Michael I Cerularius, who was serving as the Patriarch of Constantinople. After his time in Constantinople, Ibn Buṭlān remained in the Byzantine Empire and eventually became a monk for the Greek Orthodox Patriarchate of Antioch amidst the end of the Macedonian Renaissance.

He is most renowned for his work Taqwīm aṣ-Ṣiḥḥa (تقويم الصحّة, lit. 'Tabular Register of Health'), a handbook on dietetics and hygiene. (Note: it details – in accordance with to the tradition of humorialism – in 40 charts the health effects of 210 plants and animals, and 70 other entries, all entries are ordered into six categories: air quality, food and drink, movement and rest, sleep regulation, elimination and retention of humours, regulation of joy, fear, anger, and distress.) It was named for its intricate tables, similar to those found within a Taqwīm as-Sana (تقويم السنة, lit. 'tabular register of the year'), a type of astrological almanac. (Note: For this reason it is sometimes translated as Almanac of Health.) He was the first person to use these tables in a non-astrological work, creating a new scientific writing format that may be seen as the main influence for works like Taqwīm al-Abdān fī Tadbīr al-Insān (Note: Arabic: تقويم الأبدان في تدبير الإنسان, lit. 'Tabular Register of Bodies in the Constitution of Man' a medical work) by the Arab physician Ibn Ǧazla and Taqwīm al-Buldān by the Kurdish geographer and historian Abū 'l-Fidāʾ. (Note: Arabic: تقويم البلدان, lit. 'Tabular Register of Countries' a geographical work) (Note: There many other examples adopting Ibn Buṭlān's new format. Among the medical works are Kitāb al-Mustaʿinī (Arabic: كتاب المستعيني, lit. 'Book of Assistance') by Yusuf ibn Isḥāq ibn Biklārš, the Taqwīm al-Adwīya al-Mufrada (Arabic: تقويم الأدوية المفردة, lit. 'Tabular Register of Simple Medications') by Ibrāhīm ibn Abī Saʿīd al-ʿAlāʾī al-Maġrebī, and the Taqwīm al-Adwīya (Arabic: تقويم الأدوية, lit. 'Tabular Register of Medications') by the Georgian physician Kamāl ad-Dīn Abū 'l-Faḍl Ḥūbaiš ibn Ibrāhīm ibn Muḥammad at-Tiflīsī. A non-medical work using format would be for example Ibn Abī'r-Rabīʿ's Sulūk al-Mālik fī tadbīr al-Mamālik. (Arabic: سلوك المالك في تدبير الممالك, lit. 'The King's Conduct in Administering the Kingdom') a mirror for princes. Additionally Musṭafa ibn ʿAbdu 'llāh al-Qunsṭanṭinī cites a number of works which also have adopted this scientific writing format invented by Ibn Buṭlān.) Translations of Taqwīm aṣ-Ṣiḥḥa into Latin are preserved in many manuscripts from the early modern period, and are thought to illustrate the relationship between medieval Europe and the Arab world in the field of medicine. Despite increased European contact with Egypt and Syria through the Crusades and trade into the 16th century, there are no Latin translations of Arabic medical texts after Ibn Buṭlān's era.

Although he lived during a period when non-Muslims—the so-called People of the Pact, (Note: Arabic: أهل الذمة, romanized: Ahl aḏ-Ḏimma) who were originally Jews, Christians, and Sabians—dominated the medical profession in the Arab world, (Note: according to Muslim sources such as the manual on ḥisba by Ibn al-Uḫūwa.) Ibn Buṭlān is noteworthy for being one of only a few non-Muslim physicians from the region about whom enough is known to paint a detailed biography. Documents like the Cairo Geniza, a collection of Jewish manuscript fragments, provide scientific records about the medical practices of such physicians, but lack reliable information outside of that to create detailed biographies about them and to describe their perception and role within society, thus proving Ibn Buṭlān as an important exception.

== Education ==
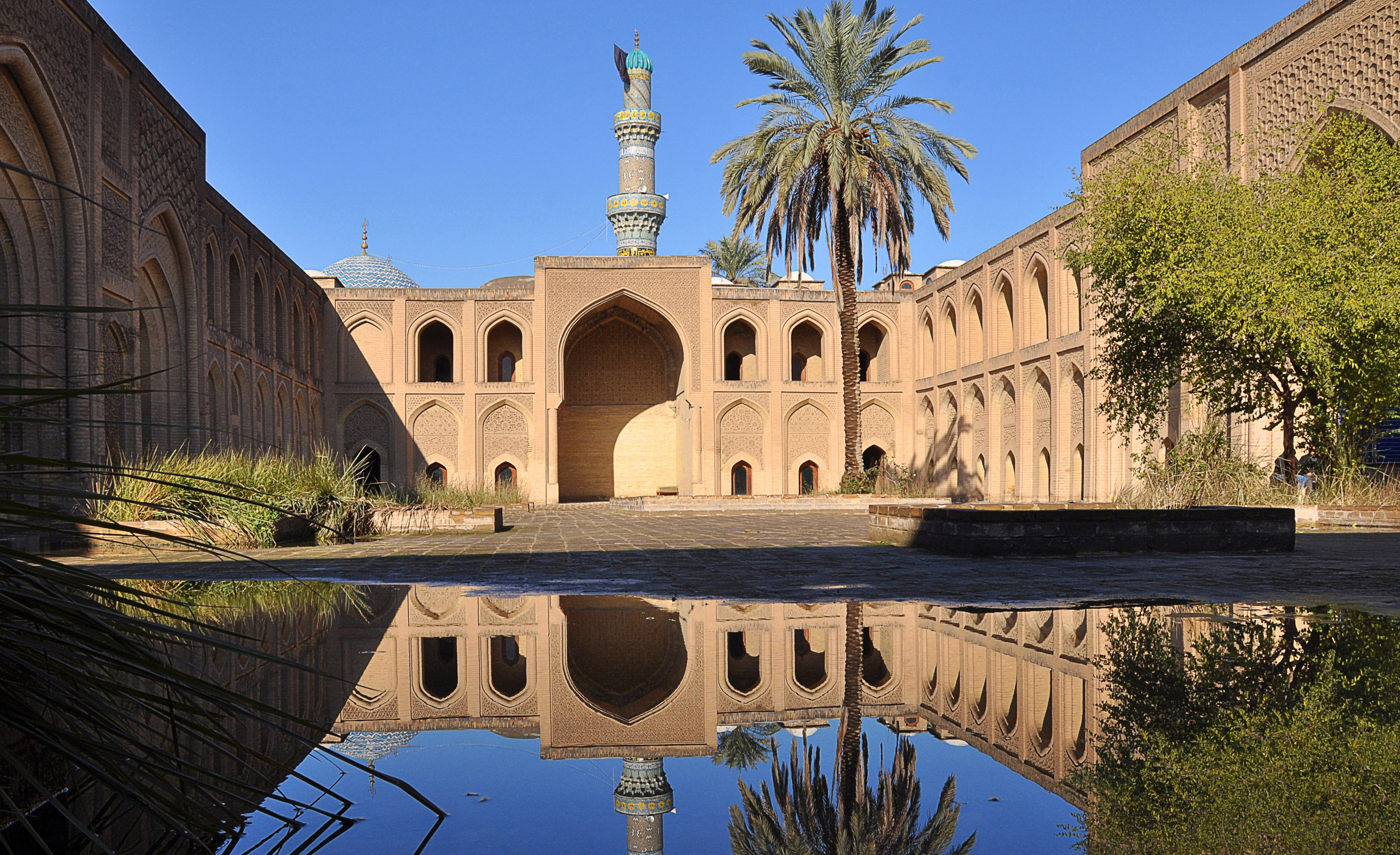
Mustansiriya Madrasah, an example of Abbasid architecture, gives a visual impression of what Ibn Buṭlān's place of learning might have looked like.

Ibn Buṭlān was the favourite student of ibn al-Ṭayyib, a Church of the East leader, priest, and polymath, at al-ʿAḍudī Hospital. He taught him about philosophy and medicine. He instructed him in the works of Galen, Aristotle, and Hippocrates – additionally in those of Porphyry, Themistius, Pedanius Dioscorides, and more contemporary Arab physicians like ibn al-Khammār, Ibn Zurʿa, and Ḥunayn ibn Isḥāq. He also was educated about practical medical procedures in line with a new experimentation-based medical learning approach proposed by Persian physician Abu Bakr al-Razi. (Note: who by many narrators is (falsely) claimed to have been instrumental in the construction of this hospital) Ibn Buṭlān studied in the al-Karḫ district of Baghdad, in which many Christians lived and also received an ecclesial education from his teacher, who is considered the most important exegete of Christian Arabic literature. He became a priest, taking up the name Yuwānnīs (Note: Arabic: إيوانيس, lit. 'John') upon his ordination. It is claimed by al-Qifṭī (Note: whose biography of Ibn Buṭlān quotes extensively from the Book of the Springtime) and by Ibn Abī Uṣaibiʿa (Note: who had access to many monograph works by Ibn Buṭlān) that he also was a student of Abū 'l-Ḥasan al-Ḥarrānī, a Sabian physician and translator. Schacht and Meyerhof however find this claim doubtful as they argue he had been deceased prior to Ibn Buṭlān's birth, though in his own Essay on Hot and Cold Remedies Ibn Buṭlān states to have been in the presence of al-Ḥarrānī in Baghdad.

Schacht and Meyerhof, as well as Conrad, claim he knew Greek based on his Christian upbringing. However Graf proves in his translation of the Essay on the Holy Eucharist that he did not know Greek, as Ibn Buṭlān states so himself. (Note: Ibn Buṭlān notes Arabic: لانی من البلاد واللغة غریب, romanized: li-annanī min al-bilād wa-'l-luġa ġarīb, lit. 'for I am foreign to the land and language' about the Greek language and the Byzantine Empire in this Essay.) However Ibn aṭ-Ṭaiyib taught him about the writers of Greek literary classics, such as Homer. Schacht and Meyerhof, as well as Conrad, also claim that he knew Syriac based on his upbringing, while the only surviving texts of his are written in Arabic, he did address Syriac medical learning and Syriac places of learning in the Compendium for the Monasteries and the Monks. It should also be noted that a major difference between him and his teacher's generation of Christian physicians in Baghdad – in many ways even between him and his own generation – is his turn away from Syriac literature to embracing Arabic literature. He showed great interest in Arabic poetry and pursued an education therein. He himself became a teacher of medicine and philosophy before leaving Baghdad in the beginning of Ramaḍān 440 AH/January 1049 AD.

== Travels ==
His travels began with a 10-month-long journey to al-Fusṭāṭ, an hour's walk south from the newly established Fatimid capital of Cairo. According to Ibn Abī Uṣaibiʿa (Note: who is known to at times inject unsourced narrative statements into his biographies) he travelled to meet Ibn Riḍwān, a prominent medical writer and chief physician of the Fatimid caliph al-Mustanṣir bi-'llāh. Schacht and Meyerhof suggest that instead he sought employment at the court of said caliph, who held high opinions of non-Muslim physicians. According to Conrad Ibn Buṭlān's comments about the young physician's motivations to move away from Baghdad in The Physicians' Banquet, are to be understood quasi-autobiographically. Meaning that high costs of living in his hometown caused him to want to live in a more affordable city. In addition to this, there appears to have been a lack of professional opportunities in Baghdad for him.

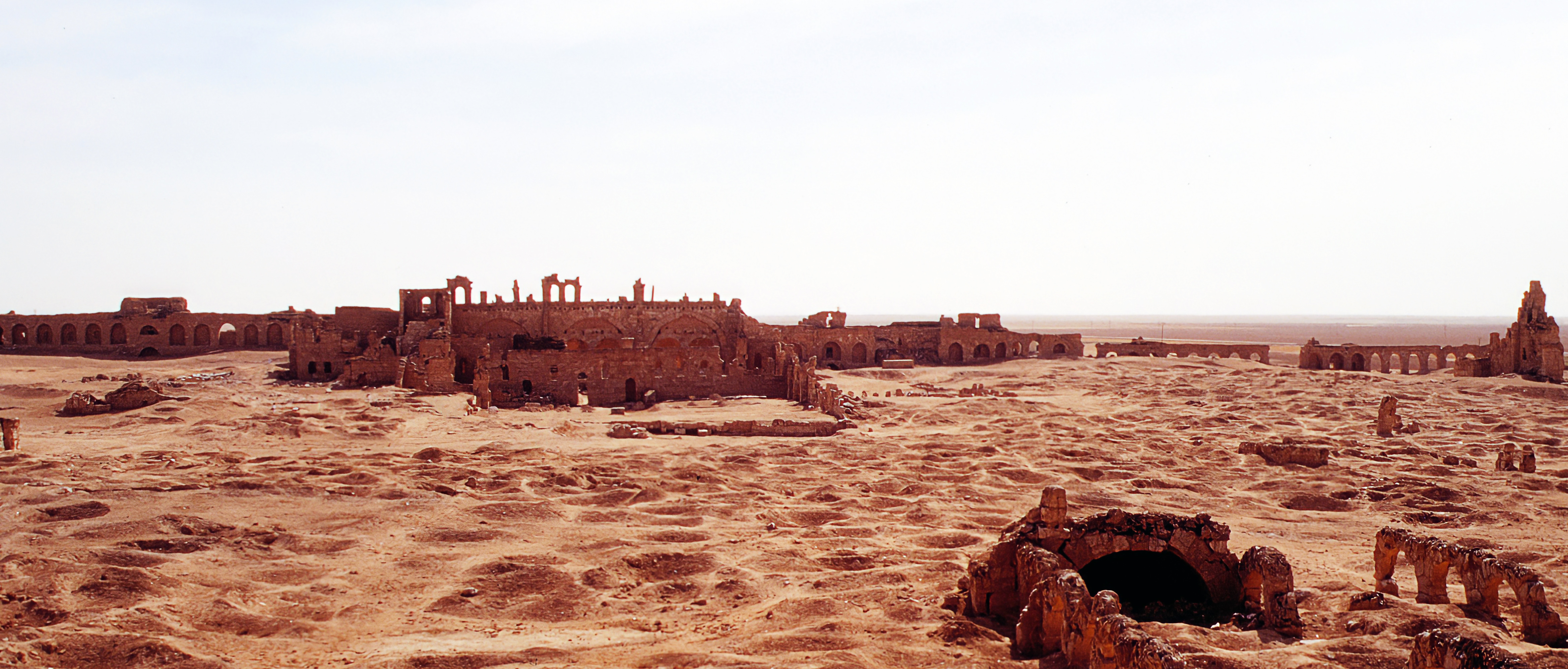
Basilica of ar-Reṣafa, now in ruins, which Ibn Buṭlān described in detail in his missives to Hilāl aṣ-Ṣabi (Note: it sits at the crossroads of three caravan routes, one coming from Palmyra in the south, one from Deir ez-Zor in the south-east, and one from Aleppo in the west)

He travelled via the Nahr ʿĪsā Canal to al-Anbar and from there to ar-Raḥba during the first 19 days of his travels. He describes ar-Raḥba as a quaint town offering a grand variety of fruits, for example 19 different kinds of grapes alone. From there it took him four days to travel to ar-Reṣafa. There he visited its castle, which was used as a caravanserai. He describes it as being very large in size, yet smaller than the Caliph's palace in Baghdad. He described the outsides of the basilica located within the castle as being covered in golden mosaics, the basilica as having been built on a cistern in the ground as large as the above ground building itself. He writes about the inhabitants of the castle, who were Christian bedouins earning their keep by guarding caravans and trading goods. Ibn Buṭlān comments about this arrangement that these beduins are "both beggars and robbers at once". He claims the basilica to have been founded by Constantine I and once restored and inhabited by Hišām ibn ʿAbd al-Malik.

Ibn Buṭlān's journey from ar-Reṣafa to Aleppo took four days. He remained in Aleppo for a longer period of time. His departure from Aleppo to travel to Antioch had him visit the Byzantine village of ʿImm. After visiting Antioch he travelled to Laodicea from there he proceeded to Damascus, then Jaffa, and finally arrived in al-Fusṭāṭ in Ǧumādā II 441 AH/November 1049 AD.

=== Aleppo ===
While in Aleppo, which he reached after 27 days, he gained the graces of Muʿizz ad-Daula Ṯimāl ibn Ṣāliḥ, the emir of the city, and set up a medical practice there.

The impression he left in northern Syria was so great that he became a notable figure in the local oral canon, three of these stories were recorded by Usāma ibn Munqiḏ in his Kitab al-Iʿtibār. In these stories, ibn Buṭlān is a medical sage operating out of a shop and has a son and students; he cures a man who had lost the ability to speak with a raṭl (in Aleppo during this time a 3/4th litre) of vinegar, which is claimed to kill a man under normal circumstances by the ibn Buṭlān of the narrative. In the second story, he explains that Usāma's grandfather, who is presumed to suffer from leprosy, is not ill, but simply suffers from skin irritations caused by adolescence, which will disappear upon him reaching adulthood. He warns of greedy medical quacks offering to cure him. In the third story, a woman who wears many veils because she persistently feels too hot is cured using camphor.

What is remarkable about these stories is that they appear to be fictional except for the personal anecdote from Usāma's own family. Ibn Buṭlān left Baghdad destitute and most certainly would not have travelled with dependants, and he was not long enough in Aleppo to be born a son there. Medicine at that time would not have been practiced out of a shop (Arabic: دكان, romanized: dukkān) but the physician's home. A raṭl of vinegar is not deadly and the anatomy in the stories is based on medical misconceptions which ibn Buṭlān did not hold. Hence his son and students are inventions to fit the motif of the medical sage curing difficult cases with superior medical knowledge, which in all likelihood means that his kunya Abū 'l-Ḥasan (lit. "father of al-Ḥasan) does not refer to a real son of his.

This is also backed up by ibn Abī Uṣaybiʿa, who quotes him lamenting having to die without any offspring or ever having taken a wife with a line from one of Ibn Buṭlān's poems:

When I should die and go to my grave,

No one will mourn or my vigil keep,

Save my medical comrades and books:

All of these will be left to weep

وَلَا أَحَدٌ أَنْ مِتُّ يَبْكِي لِمِيتَتِي
سِوىَ مَجْلِسِي فِي الْطِّبِّ وَالكُتْبُ بَاكِيَا

wa-lā aḥadun an mittu yabkī li-mītatī

siwā maǧlasī fī aṭ-ṭibbi wa-'l-kutbu bākīyā

Another such legend is told by Abu Dharr al-Harawi. In his account, he relays that ibn Buṭlān is said to have founded the hospital in Aleppo. To determine the best location, he hung up meat to check for air quality; where meat decayed the slowest and was the least discoloured. He begins his account with the cautionary phrase "qīla" (Arabic: قِيلَ, lit. 'it has been said'). This speaks to his skills in verifying oral tradition, as he does not use this phrase in the previous account in which he tells of ibn Buṭlān founding the hospital in Antioch. This legend is relevant in so far as it is a variation of another medical sage-type legend told about al-Razī and al-ʿAḍudī Hospital, describing the same method, further associating ibn Buṭlān with the motif. (Note: which is equally untrue as ar-Razī was dead by the time construction on this hospital began.)

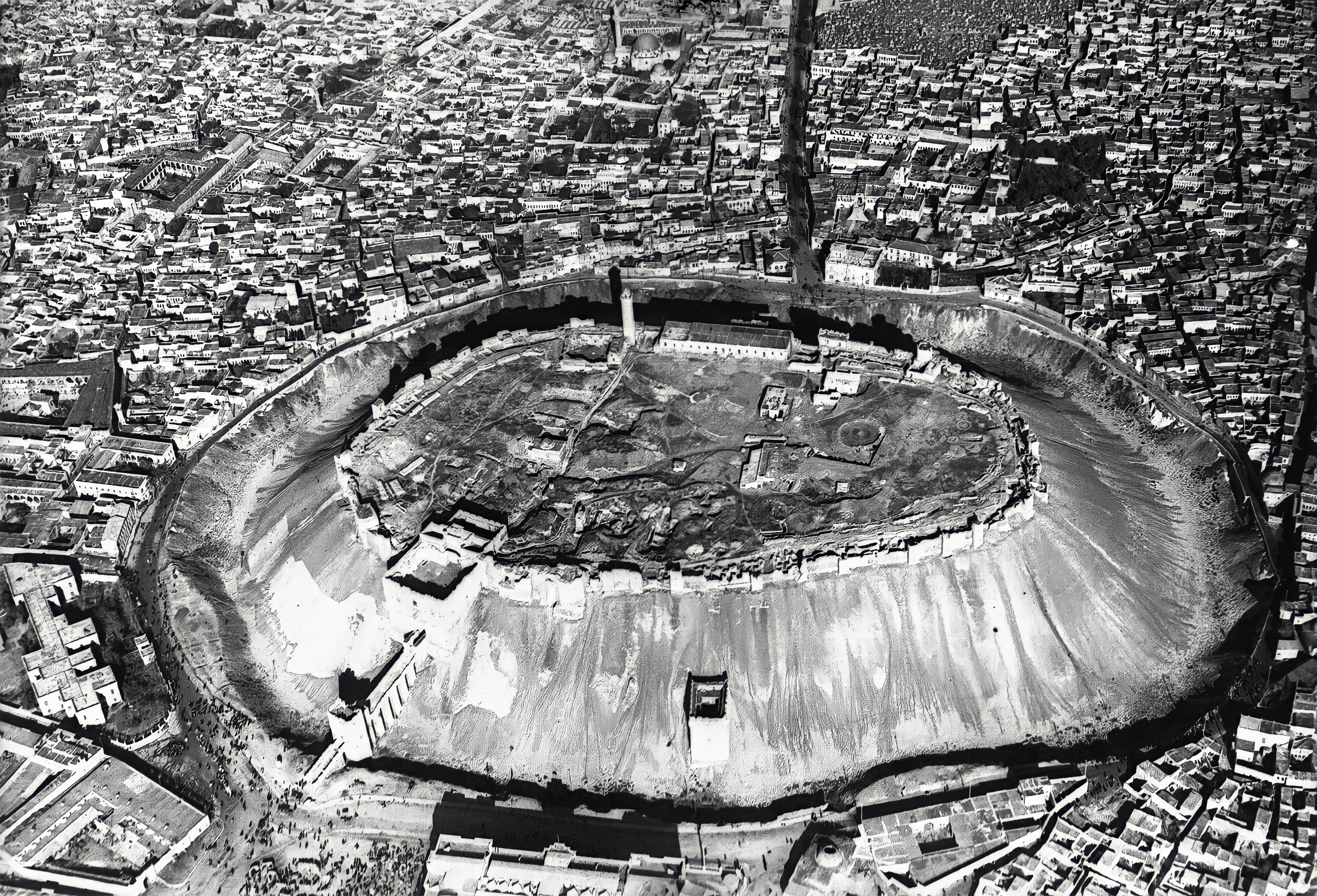
Aleppo Citadel, where the Emir Muʿizz ad-Daula Ṯimāl ibn Ṣāliḥ, who received Ibn Buṭlān kindly and honoured him, had his court

Ibn Buṭlān approached the amir, Muʿizz ad-Daula Ṯimāl ibn Ṣāliḥ, who had seized the city shortly before Ibn Buṭlān's arrival, to be entrusted with the regulation of Christian worship in Aleppo. This request was granted. Klein-Franke elucidates that Ibn Buṭlān as a student of ibn al-Ṭayyib was likely influenced by his work Law of Christianity (Arabic: فقه النصرانية, romanized: Fiqh al-Naṣrāniyya) a Church of the East treatise on jurisprudential and administrative matters containing an extensive collection of canon law to try and apply the laws and principles identified by his teacher in this community, which included extensive deliberations over marital and inheritance law.

While Ibn Buṭlān himself was, at that time, a member of the Church of the East, the Christian community in Aleppo consisted largely of Syriac Orthodox Armenians. In his narration. al-Qifṭī simply states, "and he began to enforce religious regulations according to their principles and provisions"; (Note: Arabic: وأخذ في إقامة القوانين الدينية على أصولهم وشروطهم, romanized: wa-aḫaḏa fī iqāmat al-qauāmnin ad-Dīnīya ʿalā uṣūlihim wa-šurūṭihim) this both implies that he began to change things and that ibn Buṭlān's Eastern faith and that of a Monophysite community adhere to the same beliefs, which was not the case since the Council of Chalcedon. Ibn Buṭlān would go on to condemn Monophysite beliefs in his work The Physicians' Banquet, a possible reason for the Aleppine Armenian community's staunch dislike for him long after his stay.

Likely due to these differences, conflict ensued, which culminated in a public dispute between ibn Buṭlān and Abū 'l-Ḫair al-Mubārak ibn Šarāra (Arabic: أبو الخير المبارك ابن شرارة), a physician and secretary. The two met each other and struck a conversation which turned onto the subject of dialectics. Ibn Šarāra possessed no knowledge of this subject, while ibn Buṭlān was very well educated therein. This led to ibn Šarāra being publicly humiliated. He consequently began to vilify ibn Buṭlān and instigated further agitation against him in the already oppositional Aleppine Christian community. This caused ibn Buṭlān to leave Aleppo early. It is likely for this reason that al-Qifṭī reports "and he did not find anything pleasant to say about [Aleppo] and left". (Note: Arabic: وما حمدها وخرج, romanized: wa-mā ḥamidahā wa-ḫaraǧa)

Unlike in the rest of northern Syria, his legacy in the Christian community of Aleppo was not a positive one of a legendary medical sage; instead, its members recited offensive poems about him. After his death began telling a tale that each time the lamp above his tomb in Antioch was lit, it went out instantly, implying ibn Buṭlān's grave itself to be cursed.

=== Antioch, Laodicea, and Damascus ===
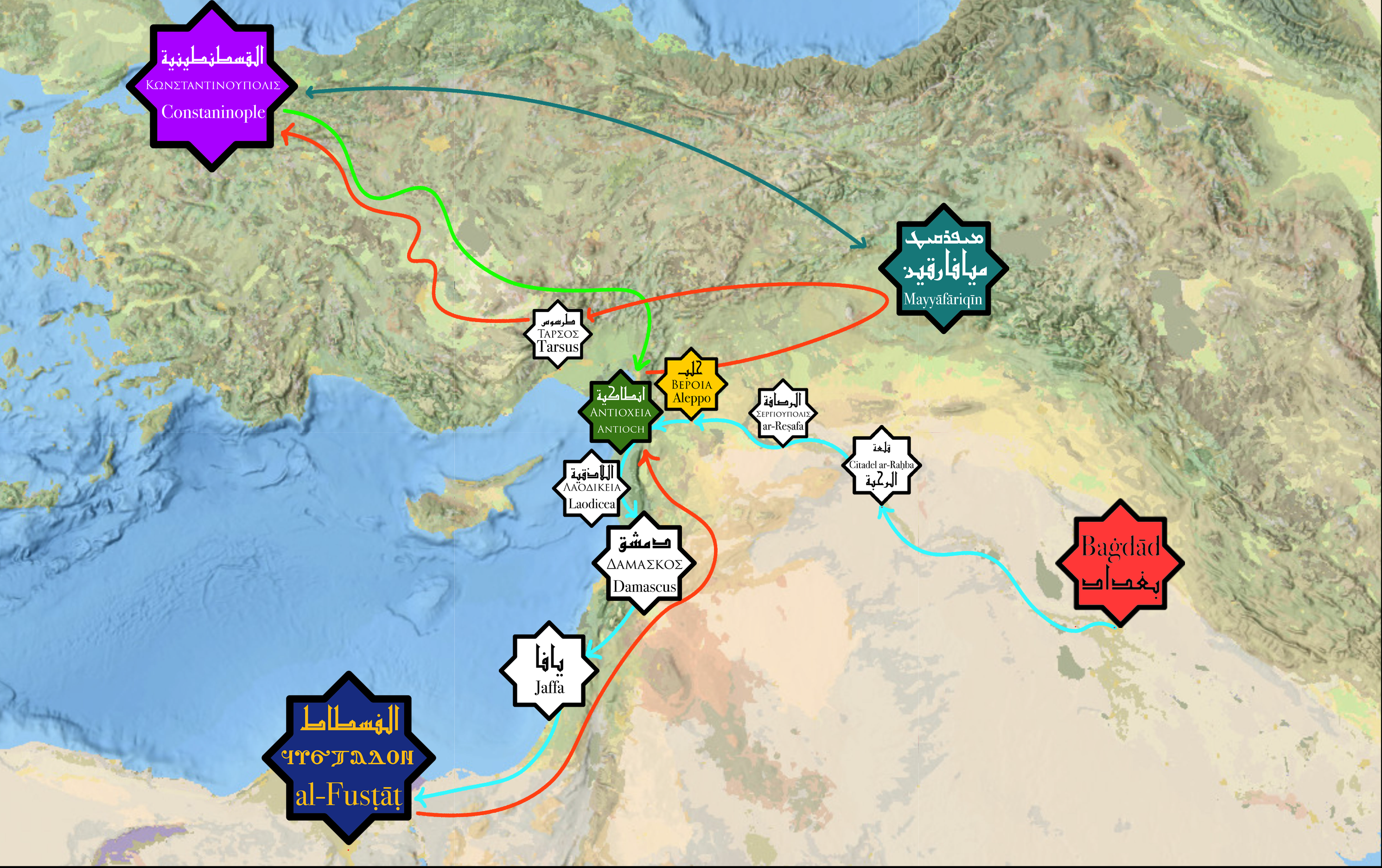
Travels of Ibn Buṭlān First Journey to al-Fusṭāt from Ramaḍān 440 AH/January 1049 AD to Ǧumādā II 441 AH/November 1049 AD Journey to Constantinople via Antioch during 442 AH/1050 AD Last journey to Antioch during 444 AH/1051 AD Visit to Māiyafāriqīn to present the Physicians' Banquet to its ruler Naṣr ad-Dawla Abū Naṣr Aḥmād ibn Marwān

After leaving Aleppo he arrived in Antioch within two days. He does not acknowledge it being under Byzantine rule at that time in any way. The ongoing geopolitical and religious conflicts and wars between Byzantines, Fāṭimids, Mirdāsids and Marwānids encountered during his travels generally remain unmentioned in his writings – attesting as Klein-Franke remarks a notable freedom of movement, despite ongoing conflicts. Ibn Buṭlān gained favour with rulers of many backgrounds and travelled across borders with no recorded difficulties doing so. He described Antioch in great detail and spoke favourably of the city. He may have had a personal relationship to Antioch and might have received a warm initial welcoming due to his teacher Ibn aṭ-Ṭaiyib being born there according to Ibn al-ʿAdīm; however Ibn al-ʿAdīm is the only source for this claim, with most other sources assuming he was born in the land of the Iraq.

Near Antioch Ibn Buṭlān visited the Monastery of Symeon the Younger, the size and fortune of which impressed him greatly. From there he travelled to al-Lāḏiqīa (Laodicea), where he conversed with Christian monks and hermits, the wisdom and insight of whom he lauded. In his descriptions he implies that the hippodrome and amphitheater were still used and that the former pagan temple of the city, which had once been converted into a mosque was now a church. He also commented on the ringing of the bells by Christians to interrupt the city's muezzin's aḏān, Conrad interprets his description to be disapproving of this behaviour by the Christian community. He also took keen interest in the agoranomos (he calls him Arabic: محتسب, romanized: muḥtasib, lit. 'ombudsman') whose duties included inspecting the prostitutes of the city and facilitating their transactions. This process consisted of gathering of all the women and the foreigners, likely meaning their procurers not their clients, and inspecting the women. Following this occurred the auction, a means of taxation, during which procurers bid against each other in dirham. Bidding more based on the women's expected profitability for the night. The winner was given the stamp of the metropolitan (Note: This may be an error by Ibn Buṭlān who was much more familiar with the organisation of the Church, than the Byzantine state and might actually refer to a similar secular authority, though both transmissions the text itself name the church office holder) and would take the woman to his brothel where she would receive clients. The wālī (Note: This term is a translation into Islamic legal Arabic by Ibn Buṭlān, however it must have been a Byzantine office with a Greek name) likely being something akin to a police officer would go around at night inspecting the brothels and criminally charge, possibly with fraud, the procurers who operated without a stamp. Ibn Buṭlān uses morally condemning and highly disapproving language when describing this process.

He After al-Lāḏiqīya he visited Damascus, where a large debate had been taking place. Subject of this debate was an old conundrum of Greek natural science, discussed in the problemata literature inherited by the Arab world: Which is warmer the young of the bird or the young chick? (Note: This question appears unreasonable in the modern day as chickens are classified as birds in every sense, but the ancient Greeks and consequently the medieval Arabs believed that the essence of birds is to be flyers and as chickens can not fly they are like other flightless birds, still closest to birds, but their way of life (Ancient Greek: βίος, romanized: bíos) makes them lack the essence of birds.) At the core of the question lies Aristotle's teaching about the relation of warmth and movement, that is the quicker something moves the warmer it is; the young chicken can peck on its own, the young bird must remain in its nest, but chickens as a whole move less quickly than birds who can fly. An otherwise unknown author by the name of Ibn al-Muwaffaqī (Note: Arabic: ابن الموفقي) had started this debate by arguing in favour of the young chicken. A Jacobite Christian physician called al-Yabrūdī (Note: this is his nisba, referring to what was then a large, majority-Christian village near Ṣaidnāyā, al-Yabrūdī Arabic: اليبرودي, lit. 'the one from Yabrūd' by which he was commonly known his full name was Abū 'l-Faraǧ Ǧūrǧis bin Yūḥannā bin Sahl bin Ibrāhīm Arabic: أبو الفرج جورجس بن يوحنا بن سهل بن إبراهيم) had responded to al-Muwaffaqī arguing that the young of the bird was warmer than the chick. Though al-Yabrūdī had passed very shortly before Ibn Buṭlān entered Damascus, the debate was still ongoing and Ibn Buṭlān was convinced of al-Yabrūdī's position though entirely unconvinced by his reasoning. This seemingly innocuous debate would be of great consequence to Ibn Buṭlān's life.

== Battle of the Physicians ==
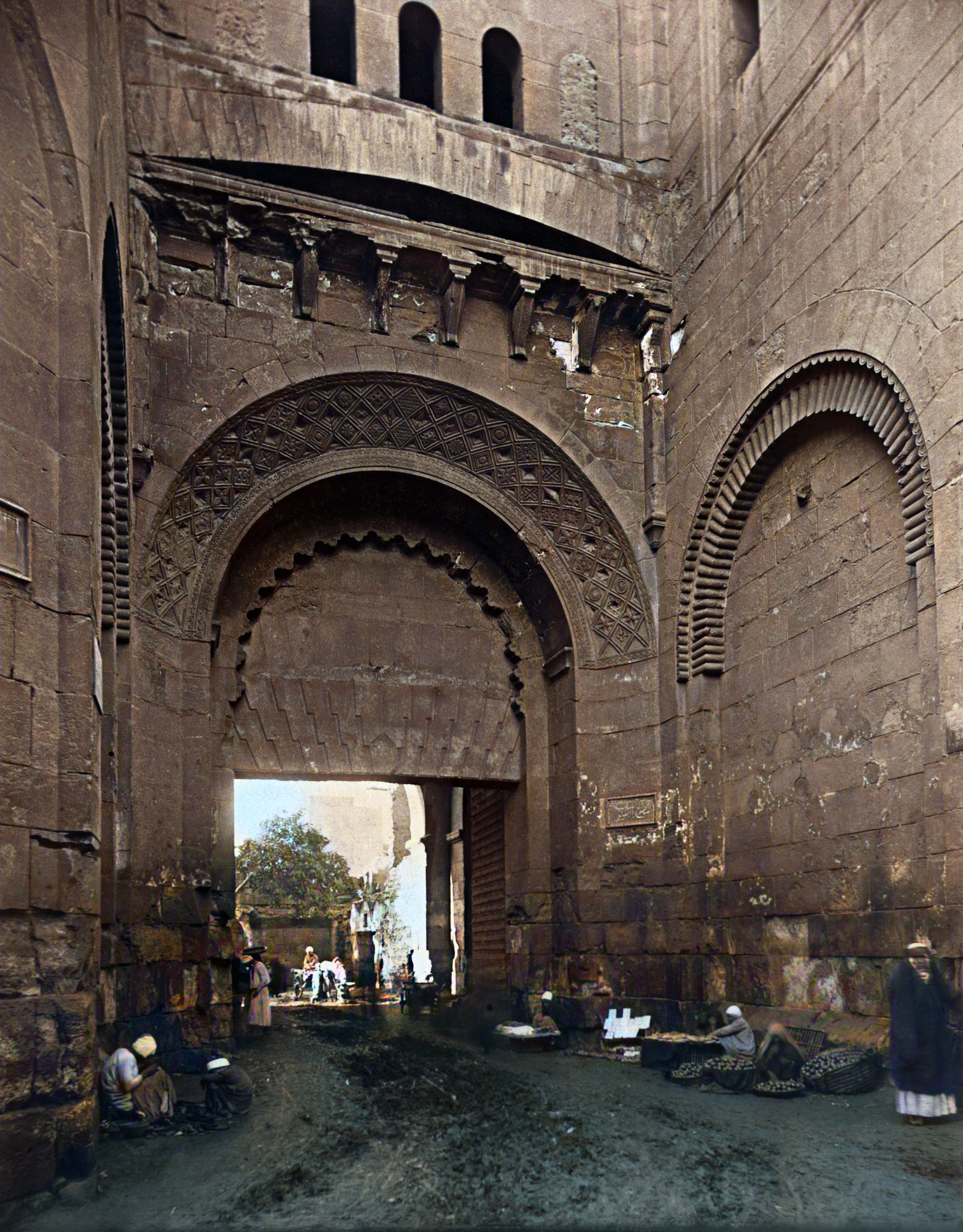
Bāb al-Futūḥ, built 30 years after Ibn Buṭlān left Cairo, with roadside merchants, as Ibn Riḍwān was during his fortune telling days, is an example of Fatimid architecture and the streetscapes which dominated the city during Ibn Buṭlān's visit.

Upon his arrival in al-Fusṭāṭ Ibn Buṭlān came to visit the palace of Ǧauahr ibn Māḍī. (Note: Arabic: القصر الجوهر بن ماضي, romanized: al-Qaṣr al-Ǧawahr bin Māḍī presumably referring to Muwaffaq ad-Daula Ǧauahr al-Mustanṣir (Arabic: موفق الدولة جوهر المستنصري) who would later become governor of Damascus (Arabic: وال دمشق, romanized: wālin dimašqa).) Conrad (understanding the Physicians' Banquet's comments about the arrival of the young physician in Māiyafāriqīn to be allegorical for Ibn Buṭlān's experiences in Egypt) and Kennedy (reading the work only as partly allegorical) both claim Ibn Buṭlān was warmly received at the court and praised by its chief physician, Ibn Riḍwān. Ibn Buṭlān had been writing missives to Hilāl aṣ-Ṣabi of Baghdad throughout his travels, these spanned a wide range of topics such as medicine and geography. Once in Egypt he began working on his notes and writings compiled during his trip in this process of writing missives, which caused him to have an excellent reputation and left Egyptian intellectuals excitedly awaiting the publishing of his finished work. Though he never finished this work, a book extensively compiled from his missives after his death called Kitāb ar-Rabīʿ proved useful to other scholars. (Note: for example to Yāqūt al-Hamawī in writing his grand Kitāb Muʿǧam al-Buldān (Arabic: كتاب معجم البلدان, lit. 'Dictionary of the Countries') Conrad suggests, based on his allegorical reading of the Physicians' Banquet that Ibn Riḍwān continued being of some help to Ibn Buṭlān, introducing him to prominent medical practitioners of the city. And yet this satirical text also makes the defamatory suggestion all decent and educated persons of the city despised, the old physician, whom Conrad understands to be Ibn Riḍwān. That these persons saw him as a self-important fraud with no interest in the serious questions of medical profession, though this passage was written long after their dispute had occurred.

Ibn Riḍwān was the son of poor baker from Giza, his parents died young he therefore had no inheritance to fund his studies with, thus he became a roadside fortuneteller to fund his education. He had his break when he was able to substitute for a friend of his who worked as a physician and began to pursue medicine with much determination; he ended up gaining a position as the chief physician of the court, being the successor to Nasṭās ibn Ǧuraiǧ, in addition to amassing a large number of students, a large personal medical library in an addition to a monetary fortune stemming from his real estate investments in the city. He therefore guarded his position in manner which was perceived as aggressive and polemicising. He also worked against the perception of having been, what the medical community of that time considered, a charlatan prior to a physician. This attitude might not solely have been the result of an irritable temperament; the nature of professional medicine in the Arab world at the time was entirely dependent on one's patrons and social standing in a city, in the absence of medical boards and standardised systems to ensure medical knowledge of practitioners. Self-learning was equally regarded as a source of education compared to learning from a teacher at an institution, therefore social standing and one's reputation were the primary basis of a successful career in medicine. Ibn Riḍwān was described by Ibn Buṭlān as a man with a fondness for "futile uproar". (Note: Arabic: شغب الباطل, romanized: šaġab al-Bāṭil) He attacked many of his colleagues with barrages of personal insults without having interacted much with them prior. One such public outburst had been targeted at Ibn aṭ-Ṭaiyib, a later one at Ibn Buṭlān. It occurred in response to Ibn Buṭlān's attempt to improve his reputation among the educated upper class of Cairo with the assumed intention of gaining a maecenas. Encouraged by an unnamed wazir of the court Ibn Buṭlān's sent the open essay On Objections, against those who said that the Chick is Warmer than the Young of the [Flying] Bird, using the Manner of Rationality to Ibn Riḍwān expecting his endorsement. This subject would have been of much interest in Cairo at the time as the city had a large poultry industry, known for its well documented widespread use of artificial egg incubation in so called "laying-hen factories". (Note: Arabic: معامل الفرّوج, romanized: Maʿāmil al-Farrūǧ) Ibn Buṭlān did not know that al-Yabrūdī, the man whose reasoning and knowledge of the ancients was described as insufficient and unconvincing by the essay, had been a personal friend of Ibn Riḍwān. Additionally Ibn Riḍwān once wanted to become a student of Ibn aṭ-Ṭaiyib himself, but could not afford the travel to Baghdad. Ibn Buṭlān also wrote in this first essay that al-Yabrūdī had been in communication with other Egyptian physicians — something which Ibn Abī Uṣaibiʿa also records — and he mentions that in the introduction to his work that education is "almost a burden in Egypt, a country in which it is hard to gain equal footing with the ignorant/foolish". (Note: Arabic: الجاهل, romanized: al-Ǧāhil)

According to Conrad this led combination of factors:

1. Ibn Riḍwān feeling he had been slighted in his honour by having been called ignorant
2. The suggestion his friend would have contacted another man about such an important question
3. That friend's honour being slighted by a man whose education he was personally jealous of
4. Ibn Riḍwān sensing a threat to his position in Cairo's social order because it was motivated by a wazir

Which in their totality led Ibn Riḍwān's response Discourse of the Sheikh Abū 'l-Ḥasan ʿAlī Ibn Riḍwān Explaining the Mistakes in the Sayings of al-Muḫtār Ibn al-Ḥasan Ibn ʿAbdūn of Baghdad (Note: Arabic: مقالة الشيخ أبو الحسن علي بن رضوان في التنبيه على ما في كلام المختار بن الحسن بن عبدون البغدادي من الاغاليط, romanized: Maqāla 'š-Šaiḫ Abū 'l-Ḥasan ʿAlī bin Riḍwān fī 't-Tanbīh ʿalā mā fī kalām al-Muḫtār bin al-Ḥasan bin ʿAbdūn al-Baġdādī min al-Aġālīṭ)) to be scathing. The tone of this work and all later works in the conflict between the two are very harsh and insulting in their language and often filled with personal insults. According to Conrad Ibn Buṭlān would later portray Ibn Riḍwān's attitude in this response as that of the stingy dinner party host who rages at guests eating scraps during his sleep. Conrad also suggests that Ibn Abī Uṣaibiʿa claims there also were physical altercation between the two as well presumably based on his reading of The Physicians' Banquet and Arabic: جرت, romanized: Ǧirat in Ibn Abī Uṣaibiʿa's article.

Ibn Buṭlān responded reciprocally with another essay to Ibn Riḍwān's response which he called the Egyptian Essay. (Note: Arabic: المقالة المصرية, romanized: al-Maqāla al-Miṣrīya) In the first chapter of this treatise he advances seven reasons as to why in-person learning from a mentor is preferable to learning from books alone. Among these are that teacher is able to correct inaccurate interpolation from manuscripts, explain difficult sections, and correct mistakes made by the student. He explain this with instructor and student being homogenous in their natures making transmission of knowledge easy. Contrarily he argues that as book and student are heterogenous in nature and hence transmission between the two is difficult. In the second chapter he argues that learning exclusively from books introduces a circulus vitiosus, as incorrect information becomes the lens through which all new acquired knowledge is filtered, which then creates a feedback loop, tainting all further learning from books. Though many of Ibn Buṭlān's arguments are observed to be reasonable ones on their face and eloquently stated by commentators, (Note: such as Schacht and Meyerhof and Ibn Abī Uṣaibiʿa) they all primarily serve to discredit Ibn Riḍwān: by attacking his humble background and a previously advanced position of his that learning from books is superior to learning from teachers.

This was a slight which Ibn Riḍwān observed and polemicised against in his response Discourse of the Sheikh Abū 'l-Ḥasan ʿAlī Ibn Riḍwān on the Fact that his Own Knowledge is True and is Wisdom and that the Opinions of Muḫtār Ibn al-Ḥasan Ibn of Baghdad are Faulty and are Sophistry. (Note: Arabic: مقالة الشيخ أبو الحسن علي بن رضوان في ان ما علمه يقين وحكمة وما ظنه مختار بن الحسن البغدادی غاط وسفسطة, romanized: Maqāla 'š-Šaiḫ Abū 'l-Ḥasan ʿAlī bin Riḍwān fī an mā ʿilmahu yaqīn wa-ḥikma wa-mā ẓannahu muḫtār bin al-Ḥasan al-Baġdādī ġalaṭ wa-safsaṭa) Ibn Riḍwān would conclude their feud with another work, the Missive of the Sheikh Abū 'l-Ḥasan ʿAlī Ibn Riḍwān Addressed to the Physicians of Old Cairo (Miṣr) and the (New) Cairo of al-Muʿizz may Allāh the Most High Protect it — in which he complains about his condition and what has happened between himself and the learned al-Muḫtār ibn al-Ḥasan of Baghdad, the physician. (Note: Arabic: الشيخ أبي الحسن علي بن رضوان الى اطباء مصر والقاهرة المعزية حرسها الله تعالى يشكو فيها حاله وما جرى بينه وبين العلامة المختار بن حسن البغدادي الطبيب, romanized: aš-Šaiḫ Abū 'l-Ḥasan ʿAlī bin Riḍwān ilā Aṭibbāʾ miṣra wa-'l-Qāhira al-Muʿizzīya ḥarasaha Allāh taʿālā yaškū fīhā ḥālihi wa-mā ǧarā bainahu wa-baina al-ʿAllāma al-Muḫtār bin al-Ḥasan al-Baġdādī aṭ-Ṭabīb) Addressed to the medical community of Egypt this relatively short work gives a brief portrayal of the conflict as concerned with matters of learning about Hippocrates and Galen, claiming that Ibn Riḍwān himself is correct about all points and Ibn Buṭlān is a fraud whose statements are to be taken as jokes and advising against any cooperation with him. This last missive appears to have been successful in ruining any prospects of Ibn Buṭlān in Egypt, as he left the country after having remained there for a year. (Note: some accounts, like that of Ibn Abī Uṣaibiʿa, give the figure of three years, but given that there is evidence of him in Syria and Constantinople a year after his arrival in Egypt this is likely false) Some scholars (Note: for example Conrad, Dagher and Troupeau, and Klein-Franke) claim that Ibn Buṭlān would give his view of events though long after having left Egypt in a satirical work they identify as quasi-autobiographical, The Physicians' Banquet.

=== Reception and interpretation ===
Ibn Abī Uṣaibiʿa in his biographies of Ibn Buṭlān and Ibn Riḍwān seems to regard this conflict mostly as a matter of personal animus between the two but comments in Ibn Buṭlān's biography that the many anecdotes of the two insulting each other are entertaining but not without useful lessons, he judges Ibn Buṭlān to be more eloquent and Ibn Riḍwān to be the better physician and better educated. Schacht and Meyerhof see the origins of the conflict as personal in nature but its dimensions as helpful in illustrating the reception of Greek and Syriac texts in the Arab world. In this they largely follow Ibn Riḍwān's last portrayal of the debate as a matter concerned with the philosophy of medicine and the reception of the ancients. They conclude Ibn Buṭlān to be better educated in a broader variety of fields and to contribute more original ideas in his thinking, incorporating newer approaches like those of ar-Razī. While Ibn Riḍwān wrote more, they judge his output to be unoriginal and intellectually stagnant. Conrad disagrees with Schacht and Meyerhof's perspective and views it as a struggle for affirmation in the medical community of Egypt largely fuelled by personal dislike between two men with large egos but insightful in illustrating the complex social arrangements needed to be a successful physician in a society without institutionalised systems verifying medical learning.

Schoeler places importance on the arguments advanced by Ibn Buṭlān against book learning in the Egyptian Essay, identifying four novel arguments advanced by him. These he sees as based in the language and concepts of Ancient Greek philosophy. Additionally he identifies two as taken directly from the Islamic study of aḥādīth, thereby proving the genetic influence on the development of the medical sciences and philosophy practiced by non-Muslims in the Islamicate world.

== Later life and death ==
His name being ruined in Egypt due to the Battle of the Physicians Ibn Buṭlān travelled to Syria via Jaffa in 442 AH/1050 AD. There he remarked the high child mortality of the city and the lack of a teacher for the city's boys. (Note: Conrad understands this comment to refer to the Muslim community of Jaffa as Christian children would have been educated by a cleric.) From there he went on to Antioch, Abū Dharr al-Harauī suggests he spent time in both Antioch and Aleppo during this period. In his Essay on Hot and Cold Remedies from 455 AH/1063 AD Ibn Buṭlān however cites "master teachers of the city" (Note: Arabic: مشايخ المدينة, romanized: mašāyiḫ al-Madīna) on living conditions and other rudimentary information like the weather and housing conditions, this according to Conrad might suggest that Ibn Buṭlān did not return to the city due to his ruined reputation from his previous squabble there, rather relying on colleagues for information. Ibn Buṭlān personally reports on the Church of al-Qusyān and its administration. (Note: Ibn Buṭlān believes the church to be named after and founded by Arabic: قسيان الملك, romanized: Qusyāna al-Malik, lit. 'King Qusyān' whose son was resurrected by Saint Peter, a story which appears to only have existed in the local oral tradition of that time.) The church had been struck by lightning during a storm in April 1050 AD and required repairs. On the 5th of August that year he reports about a number of earth quakes which had occurred in Byzantine territory, destroying a fortress and a church, numerous farms, and bringing forth hot springs and a swamp, causing the inhabitants of the affected places to lose all their belongings and flee to cities like Antioch. From Antioch headed to Ṭarsūs, where he reported on the tomb of al-Maʾmūn which had fallen into disrepair.

From there he travelled to Constantinople to join a monastery there, during this journey he wrote the Essay on the Holy Eucharist at the behalf of the Patriarch of Constantinople, Michael I Cerularius. The fact that he was invited by such an important figure of Eastern Christianity to elucidate the Oriental perspective on the debates leading to the Schism of 1054, demonstrates that his outstanding reputation was not limited to Islamic circles in the Fatimid and Abbasid caliphates but extended also into the Christian world. This is becomes furthermore evident when looking at Ibn Buṭlān's interaction with the wazir Faḫr ad-Daula Abū Naṣr bin Ǧahīr (Note: Arabic: فخر الدولة أبو نصر بن جهير) on a diplomatic mission to the Byzantine capital on behalf of the ʿUqailid Emir Zaʿīm ad-Daula Abū Kāmal Baraka bin al-Muqallid. (Note: Arabic: زعيم الدولة أبو كامل بركة بن المقلد) Faḫr ad-Daula remarked how warmly received and cared for he was by Ibn Buṭlān and also how much access his host had to the Byzantine Emperor Constantine IX Monomachos. This must have occurred prior to 443 AH/1052 AD given the Emir's short reign. In the year 446 AH/1054 AD Ibn Buṭlān observed a plague in Constantinople in which 14,000 bodies were buried in the cemetery of the church St. Luke, after all other burial grounds were filled. According to Ibn Abī Uṣaibiʿa he authored The Physicians' Banquet in the monastery (Note: Ibn Abī Uṣaybiʿa records it as having been managed by Arabic: الملك المنيح قسطنطين, romanized: al-Malik al-Mnīḥ Qunsṭanṭīn, lit. 'the good King Constantine', presumably referring to Constantine IX Monomachos. Oltean identifies the monastery of Saint Mokios, which encompassed a xenodochion and a hospital on its premisses, as the most likely location.) in Constantiople, but Kennedy speculates that most of the work was written prior to his departure from Egypt. He dedicated the work to the Marwanid Emir Naṣr ad-Daula Abū Naṣr Aḥmād ibn Marwān the ruler of Māiyafāriqīn in the province of Diyār Bakr. He visited the city and met Abū Yaḥyā the son of Abū 'l-Qasim al-Ḥusain ibn ʿAlī al-Maġribī, though he likely visited after having finished the work. When exactly he visited the city is unclear, though Conrad suggests that it might have initially been on his journey to Constantinople, returning for a second time later to present The Physicians' Banquet. In the treatise itself he comments on the low level of medical knowledge in the town, though as some scholars (Note: for example Conrad, Dagher and Troupeau, and Klein-Franke) regard the work as allegorical for his experiences in Cairo this might not be considered a neutral report.

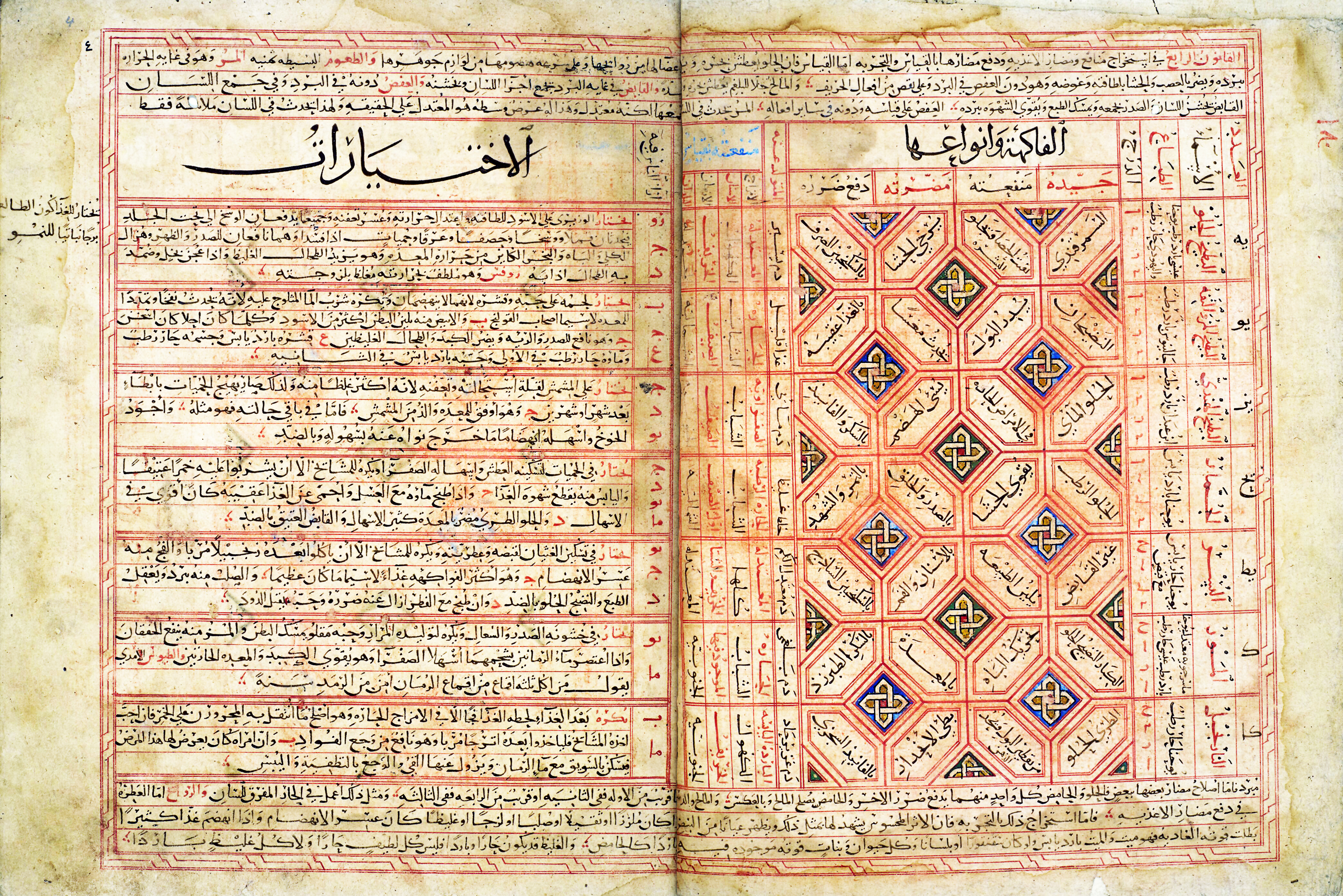
Eponymous intricate table from a Taqwīm as‑Siḥḥa manuscript

Having seemingly hastily finished the Essay on the Holy Eucharist and not being able to speak Greek Ibn Buṭlān relied on an interpreter, named ʿĪsa, provided by the Patriarch to have his arguments communicated in Greek at the synod of Byzantine prelates, first in private to Cerularius, then publicly to all present, with a later reading to the papal delegates at the synod being planned but never occurring due to the papal delegates never showing up with the synod eventually being dissolved. Ibn Buṭlān's involvement with the Patriarch of Constantinople and his stay in a monastery in Constantinople raise the question of his religious affiliation: his background and education in Baghdad, the episode involving Aleppo's Christian community, and the Essay on the Holy Eucharist themselves provide strong evidence that ibn Buṭlān at least up to this point was an Eastern Christian of the East Syriac Rite, as Conrad however points out, there are indicators, that he "was fairly undifferentiated" in his understanding of his Christian identity with cautious distance to all different denominations. Oltean examines this issue further, looking at Ibn Buṭlān's contacts and friendships, beginning with Abū Naṣr ibn al-ʿAttār, a chief judge of Antioch, Abū 'l-Faraǧ Yaḥyā ibn Saʿīd ibn Yaḥyā, a Melkite physician in Antioch, Yūḥannā al-Anṭākī, an Antiochian priest, possibly ʿAbdallāh ibn al-Faḍl al-Antākī, a famed theologian and translator, in addition to Symeon Seth and Michael Psellos. (Note: Michael Psellos brags in a letter to Michael I Cerularius that he has an eager student from "beyond the borders of Babylon" (Babylon referring either to Cairo or Baghdad) likely referencing Ibn Buṭlān) Further supporting Oltean's hypothesis about Seth's friendship and intellectual camaraderie is Pietrobelli and Cronier's hypothesis of a relationship between Ibn Buṭlān and Symeon Seth based not simply on time and place alone (Note: both having lived in Antioch and Constantinople during each other's life times and traversed the same class of intellectuals) but also based on their intellectual output. Namely, Seth's uncredited reception of Buṭlān's Taqwīm aṣ-Ṣiḥḥa in form of a partial translation in his work On the Handbook of Health by the Balance of the Six Causes. Hence they argue the historical and textual evidence makes the polymath Seth a likely student of the physician Ibn Buṭlān during the 1060s and possibly before. Mavroudi also hypothesizes a possible relationship between Michael Psellos and Ibn Buṭlān, whom she firmly situates within the Eastern Christian tradition likening the use of men who from the Eastern Orthodox perspective are heretics to Psellos' use of pagan authors in this same debate.

Oltean unlike other scholars does not highlight isolated relationships of ibn Buṭlān, but rather identifies an entire intellectual circle to in Byzantine territory to which Ibn Buṭlān belonged. He sees that Ibn Buṭlān's approach in his essay, which seems to focus on reconciliation between the two conflicting sides, echoes the position of the Greek Orthodox Patriarch Peter III of Antioch. Which ties him, as the key figure, into this intellectual circle as well. Graf also argues that Ibn Buṭlān's treatise is not original, but rather an echo of Greek polemics particularly those of Peter III of Antioch and of Cerularius himself. His reason for this is the argument that there was no serious discussion or standardised practice regarding which offering (Note: Arabic: قربان‌, romanized: Qurbān) is to be employed during the Holy Eucharist in the Greek, Syriac, and Coptic churches prior Cerularius bringing up the issue and Ibn Buṭlān being the first Oriental Christian to dogmatically comment on the issue, there were no other sources Ibn Buṭlān could have consulted. It is only in sections on the dogmatic categorisation of Eucharist and sections mentioning certain cultic practices during the Eucharist and the reason for their existence that Ibn Buṭlān departs from echoing Greek perspectives on the issue and argues truly from an Eastern perspective. On these issues Ibn Buṭlān isn't the first Oriental Christian exegete and the primary source for his arguments is his teacher Ibn aṭ-Ṭaiyib, though Ibn Buṭlān seems to argue more rigidly and certain of his beliefs than his teacher.

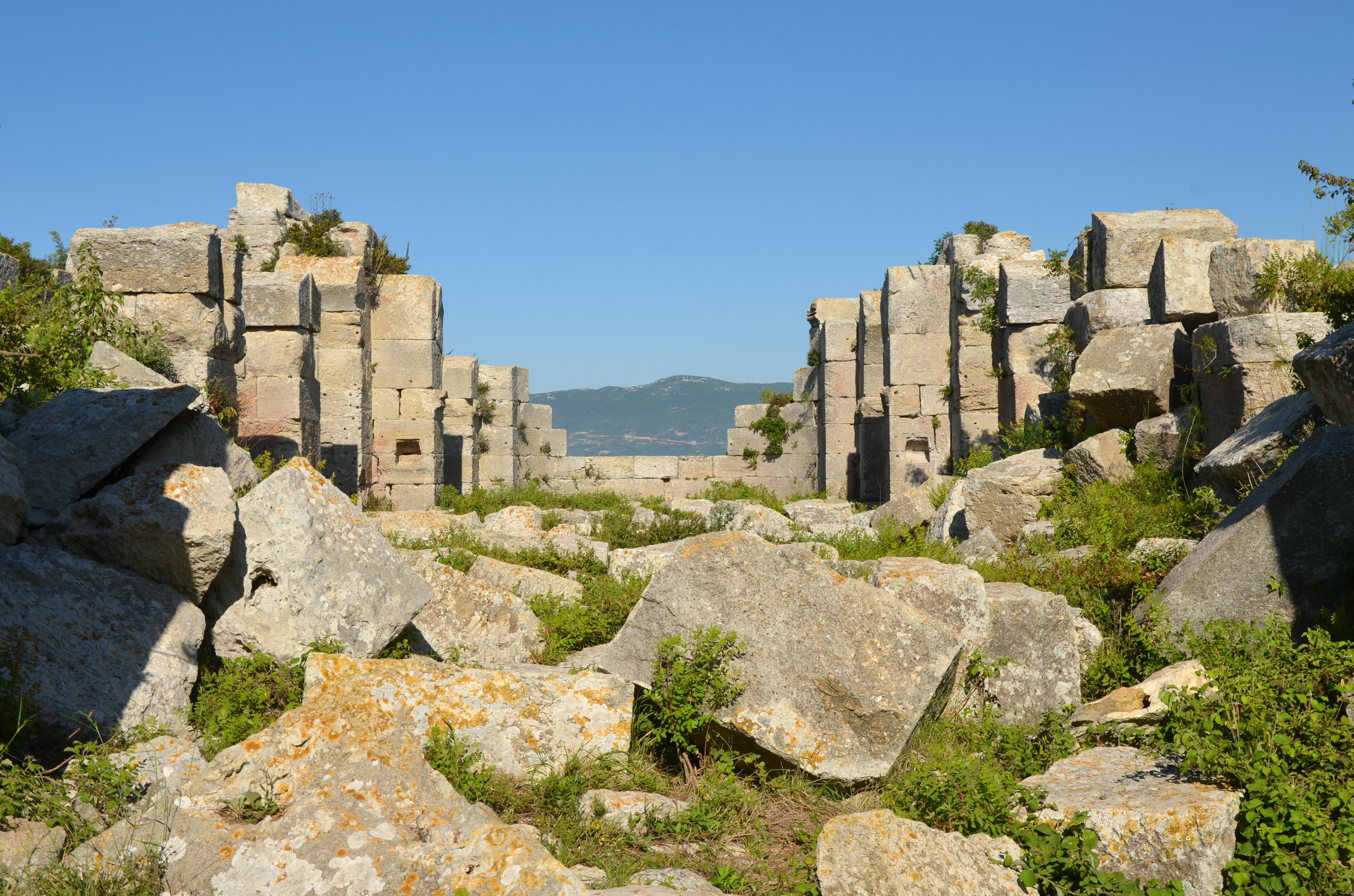
Remains of Monastery of St. Simeon Stylites the Younger near Antioch

After his time in Constantinople he returned to Antioch, where he would spend his last years in a monastery, writing and constructing the hospital. In this context he would pen the Compendium for the Monasteries and the Monks, which in its last two chapters display great knowledge of and concern for the monastical life and the common needs arising therein. His good connections in Antioch and possible friendship with the Peter III certainly would explain the choice of location. Oltean argues based on the lack of a Church of the East presence in Antioch and the troubled state of the Jacobite Armenian Monophysite community in the city and his mockery of their creed in the Banquet of the Priests, that he must have joined a Melkite monastery there. Based on Oltean's research the most likely choice for this monastery appears to be the Monastery of Symeon the Younger, which Ibn Buṭlān had praised earlier during his travels. In this context he likely even met Nikon of the Black Mountain and played a role in his possible emission to Baghdad. Though the lack of more concrete sources for this later part of his life make many of these conclusions speculative.

== Astronomical observations ==
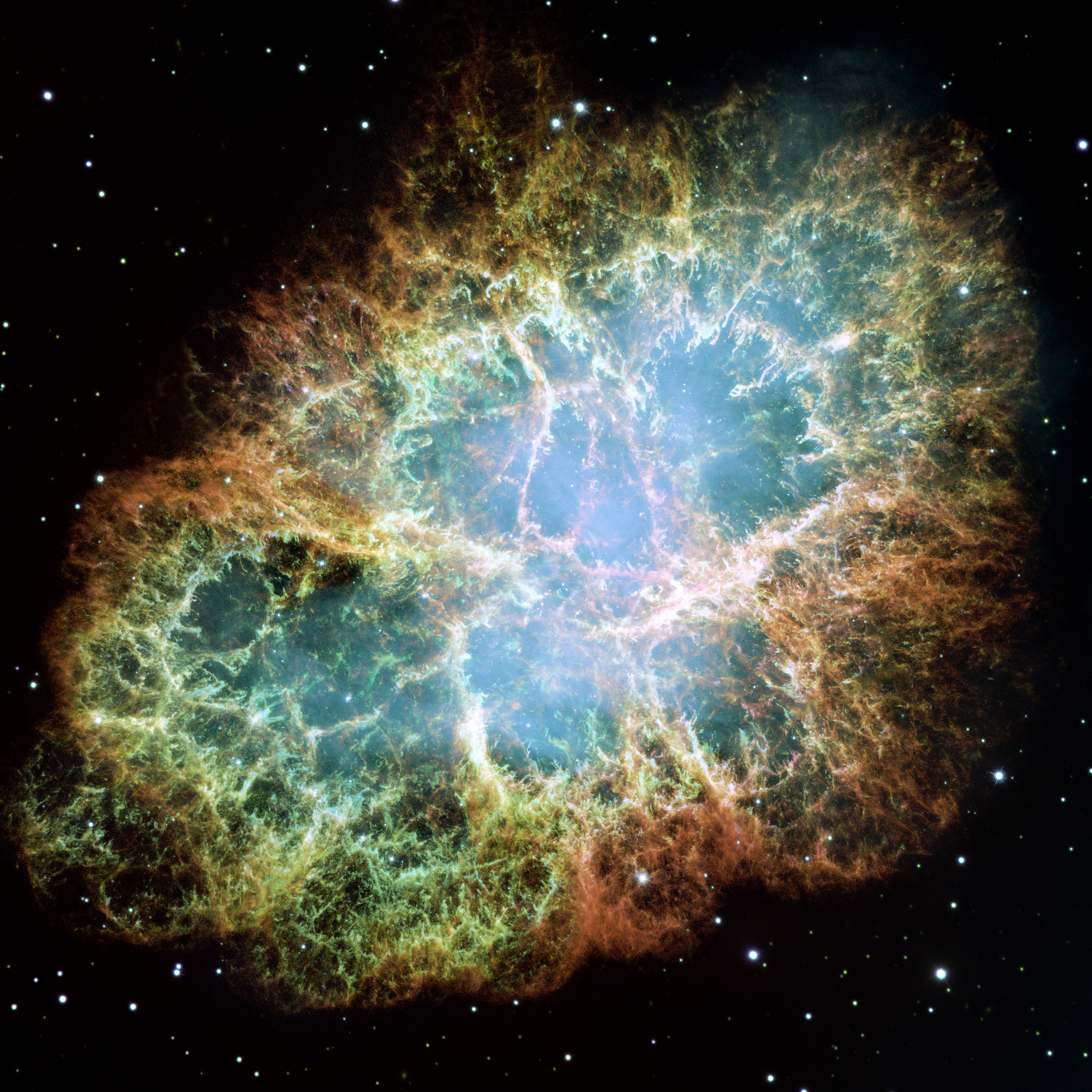
Remnant of the supernova SN 1054 observed by Ibn Buṭlān

A large supernova named SN 1054 in modern astronomy occurred in the year 1054 AD/446 AH. It was well observed by Chinese and Japanese astronomers in their writings, the great detail of which allowed for it to be identified as the origin of the Crab Nebula in the modern day. But modern astronomers were puzzled by the lack of European and Middle Eastern reports of the event. This lack of recordings was used by George Sarton to suggest that "the failure of medieval Europeans and Arabs to recognise such phenomena was not due to any difficulty in seeing them, but to prejudice and spiritual inertia connected with the groundless belief in celestial perfection". Other researchers hypothesised the skies in the Middle East and Europe had been entirely clouded for six months during the occurrence of the supernova.

The discovery and interpretation of Ibn Abī Uṣaibiʿa's writings on Ibn Buṭlān by the astrophysicist Kenneth Brecher in 1978 led to a reconsideration of such positions and consequently to the discovery of medieval Arab medical sources as useful to modern astronomers, as these records did suggest Ibn Buṭlān had, in fact, recorded SN 1054. He believed the event to be connected to a low water level of the Nile and a consequent famine decimating much of Egypt, as well as multiple devastating epidemics throughout Egypt, Syria, Upper Mesopotamia, the Iraq, Persia, and the Yemen.

Ibn Buṭlān was not a professional astronomer nor an astrologer, rather he was a physician operating according to the tradition of Galen and Hippocrates both of whom believed in a connection between cosmic and telluric events, illness and natural catastrophes. The separation between astrologers and physicians however remains clear in these Greek texts, but this separation of functions went away in the reception of the Greeks by medieval Arabs and Persians. Hence Ibn Buṭlān observed the stars with the intent of gaining knowledge of medical importance like many of his contemporary physicians. While he engages in astronomy, he does not express any confidence in this science, in fact in matters were astrological and physiological or pathological insight collide, the latter two always prevail in his analyses, something which also representative of the attitudes of most of his contemporaries. Ibn Abī Uṣaibiʿa by quoting Ibn Buṭlān in the encyclopaedic entry about him (as well as in the entry about Ibn Riḍwān) preserved enough information to identify the supernova. As the former quotation introduces problems in determining the dates of the event with when Ibn Buṭlān supposedly observed it, while the latter reveals these problems to be due to an error made by Ibn Abī Uṣaibiʿa in quoting from Ibn Buṭlān the former passage:

Ibn Buṭlān journeyed from Egypt to Constantinople where he remained for a year. During this time many pestilential diseases occurred. I quote the following from what he wrote in his own hand about this matter:

One of the famous calamities of our time was that which occurred when the star leaving marks (Arabic: الكوكب الأثاري, romanized: al-Kaukab al-Aṯārī) rose in Gemini in the year 446. By the autumn of this year fourteen thousand souls were buried in the Church of St. Luke after all the other burial grounds in Constantinople had been filled. By midsummer of the year 447 the Nile had not risen and most of the inhabitants of al-Fusṭāṭ and Damascus died along with all the foreigners, except those whom God spared. The devastation then went on to the Iraq and destroyed most of its inhabitants, and it suffered ruin from the blows of aggressor armies. This continued until the year 454. In most of the lands people suffered from melancholic ulcers (Arabic: قروح سوداوية, romanized: qurūḥ saudāwīya) and swellings of the spleen (Arabic: أورام الطحال, romanized: Aurām aṭ-Ṭiḥāl), and there was a change in the pattern of paroxysms during fevers and the normal system of crises was disturbed. Consequently the ability to predict was affected.

After this, Ibn Buṭlān continues:

Because this star leaving traces rose in the sign of Gemini, which is the ascendant of Egypt, the pestilence occurred in al-Fusṭāṭ, with the Nile failing to rise during its appearance in the year 445, and Ptolemy's warning of woe to the people of Egypt when one of the comets ascends and becomes abundant in Gemini came true. When Saturn descended into the sign of Cancer, the ruin the Iraq, Mosul, and al-Ǧazīra was complete, and Diyār Bakr, Diyār Rabīʿa, Diyār Muḍar, Fārs, Kirmān, the lands of the West, the Yemen, al-Fusṭāṭ, and Syria became desolate. The kings of the earth were in disarray, and war, inflation of prices, and pestilence proliferated, and Ptolemy's words that when there is a conjunction of Saturn and Mars in Cancer the world will be in upheaval proved true.

وسافر ابن بطلان من ديار مصر إلى القسطنطينية وأقام بها سنة وعرضت في زمنه أوباء كثيرة ونقلت من خطه فيما ذكره من ذلك ما هذا مثاله:

قال ومن مشاهير الأوباء في زماننا الذي عرض عند طلوع الكوكب الأثاري في الجوزاء من سنة ست وأربعين وأربعمائة فإن في تلك السنة دفن في كنيسة لوقا بعد أن امتلأت جميع المدافن التي في القسطنطينية أربعة عشر ألف نسمة في الخريف فلما توسط الصيف في سنة سبع وأربعين لم يوف النيل فمات في الفسطاط والشام أكثر أهلها وجميع الغرباء إلا من شاء ﷲ وانتقل الوباء إلى العراق فأتى على أكثر أهله واستولى عليه الخراب بطروق العساكر المتعادية واتصل ذلك بها إلى سنة أربع وخمسين وأربعمائة وعرض للناس في أكثر البلاد قروح سوداوية وأورام الطحال وتغير ترتيب نوائب الحميات واضطرب نظام البحارين فاختلف علم القضاء في تقدمة المعرفة.

وقال أيضاً بعد ذلك

ولأن هذا الكوكب الأثاري طلع في برج الجوزاء وهو طالع مصر أوقع الوباء في الفسطاط بنقصان النيل في وقت ظهوره في سنة خمس وأربعين وأربعمائة وصح إنذار بطلميوس القائل الويل لأهل مصر إذا طلع أحد ذوات الذوائب وانجهم في الجوزاء ولما نزل زحل برج السرطان تكامل خراب العراق والموصل والجزيرة واختلت ديار بكر وربيعة ومضر وفارس وكرمان وبلاد المغرب واليمن والفسطاط والشام واضطربت أحوال ملوك الأرض وكثرت الحروب والغلاء والوباء وصح حكم بطلميوس في قوله إن زحل والمريخ متى اقترنا في السرطان زلزل العالم.

Though he connects his observations to predictions by Ptolemy about a comet, what is termed in this report a 'star leaving marks' (Note: Arabic: الكوكب الأثاري, romanized: al-Kawkab al-Aṯārī) is, in fact, a supernova and the terminology used resembles that used by Ibn Riḍwān Arabic: الأثر, romanized: al-Aṯār, lit. 'the mark; the vestige; the work of art' when he described the supernova SN 1006. This supernova was witnessed by Ibn Riḍwān in April and May 1006 AD/Raǧab of 396 AH, termed by him to have been during "at the beginning of my studies". (Note: Arabic: في مبدأ تعليمي, romanized: fī mabdaʾ taʿlīmī) Of the two dates given for the supernova's appearance in this quoted account: 445 and 446 AH, one must be false. Thus the before-mentioned second encyclopaedic entry about Ibn Riḍwān by Ibn Abī Uṣaibiʿa is helpful in making apparent Ibn Abī Uṣaibiʿa's erroneous date in the second paragraph of the first quotation, as in this second quotation Ibn Buṭlān is quoted about a shortage of supplies in Egypt in 445 AH which he says was increased when the Nile fell 'in the year which followed it.' (Note: Arabic: في السنة التي تليها, romanized: fī as-Sana allatī talīhā) Ibn Buṭlān's comments about the level of Nile failing to rise refer to the period prior to its annual flooding during midsummer and hence also speak of the season during which we know the supernova occurred.

Jadon identifies this event as pivotal in Ibn Buṭlān's eyes for the history of medicine in the Near East. According to him a decline both in scholarly writing on medicine and the quality of medical practice was underway at this time and he credited it to this plague and its decimating effects on the number of scholars and physicians.

== Reception ==
In the 12th century a physician from Baghdad, ʿAli ibn Aṯradī wrote a commentary for The Physicians' Banquet. He was a member of an Eastern Christian Baghdadi family that provided three generations worth of prominent physician-philosophers. At the request of Maḥfūẓ ibn al-Masīḥī, a Christian physician from the city of an-Nīl in Iraq, he wrote and sent the work as a missive. His commentary is solely concerned with addressing the questions which are posed by the young physician but not answered in the original work. The satirical character thereof goes unnoticed by him, as he answers questions which were posed in a humorous fashion by Ibn Buṭlān with lengthy deliberations of his own. In this treatise it becomes clear that ʿAli ibn Aṯradī unlike Ibn Buṭlān was not an empiricist this makes his explanations of his diagnostic process valuable, in addition to this feature he also incorporates of Ibn Sīna whom ʿAli ibn Aṯradī credits for the idea of such a work addressing questions by a prominent physician. This also speaks to Ibn Buṭlān's reputation during that period. Klein-Franke, Dagher, and Troupeau claim Ibn Buṭlān himself did not incorporate any thought from Ibn Sīna into his work, as he likely did not have any knowledge of him and view this commentary as the first point of contact between their respective works. Jadon however identifies the Compendium for the Monasteries and the Monks, partially at least as an abbridgment of the Qānūn by Ibn Sīna.

Ibn Buṭlān is variously known by the names Elbochasim de baldach, Elbocasim de baldach, Albulkasem de Baldac, Ububchasym de Baldach, Eluchasem Elimitar, and Albullasem de baldak in medieval Latin texts and Europe at large. Baldach being Medieval Latin for Baghdad.

There is some ambiguity in determining the birthday and date of death for Ibn Buṭlān. With regards to the birthday this is not surprising as such information was not of any social importance in the 11th century Arab world and the actual age of a person of secondary importance compared to the idealised age of 72 years in medieval Arab biographical literature. Conrad suggests that Ibn Buṭlān likely did not even himself know when he was born. With regards to his date of passing most of the confusion comes down to an error introduced by al-Qifṭī; who in his biography of Ibn Buṭlān claims he died in the year 444 AH/1052 AD. This is an impossibility given that Ibn Abī Uṣaibiʿa lists works written up to 11 years after that time and even quotes Ibn Buṭlān commenting on previously discussed astronomical events which modern science can securely say occurred after that date. An exact date of his death comes transmitted however by al-Ḥalabī who through an acquaintance saw it noted by the descendants of Abū 'l-Ḫair al-Mubārak ibn Šarāra (Ibn Buṭlān's former adversary from Aleppo) that he died on 8 Šauwāl 458 AH/2 September 1066 AD. This date was also used by Schacht for his entry on Ibn Buṭlān in the Encyclopaedia of Islam. As well as by Klein-Franke in his biography of Ibn Buṭlān. Though other scholars like Graf (who also identifies the date of 444 AH as incorrect) state more general date ranges like "after 1067/68"; Ibn Buṭlān commonly uses Arabic: سنة الإسكندر, romanized: Year of Alexander, lit. 'Sana 'l-Iskandar', that is Anno Graecorum for dates in his texts, this often causes trouble for other authors when converting it to other systems, Ibn Abī Uṣaibiʿa converts the Year of Alexander 1365 to 450 AH, miscalculating by 4 years, while an apostille in a manuscript of the Essay on the Holy Eucharist converts Ibn Buṭlān giving the Year of Alexander 1365 to 760 Era of the Martyrs instead of 770 Era of the Martyrs.

At times a work called Arabic: عمدة الطبيب في معرفة النبات, romanized: ʿUmda 'ṭ-Ṭabīb fī maʿrifa 'n-Nabāt is falsely attributed to Ibn Buṭlān, it is however a work by an Andalusian botanist.

== Published works ==
Translated Title	Arabic Title	Transliteration	Description
Tabular Register of Health	كتاب تقويم الصحة	Kitāb Taqwīm aṣ-Ṣiḥḥa	Famous humoralist work, also known as Tacuinum Sanitatis.Tacuinum, an Arabic loanword in Latin and its later Italian descendant taccuino (Note: meaning any kind of notebook or book able to fit into one's pocket) derive from its name. This speaks to Ibn Buṭlān's influence, as the Tacuinum Sanitatis a 13th century Palermitan abbreviated translation, considered a synthesis of the Arabic work ordered by Manfred of Sicily, popularised the term. (Note: it is however unclear if this was the first Latin translation) Aside from Galen major influences on Ibn Buṭlān's penmanship of the Taqwīm aṣ-Ṣiḥḥa were Isaac Judaeus and Ibn Riḍwān (Haly Eben Rodoam in medieval Latin). The other noteworthy translation of this work is into the Persian language, compiled around the 12th century AD it provides a wealth of linguistic insights into Persian medical terminology and serves as an important resource for Early Classical Persian, it remains very a very close translation both in style and language to the Arabic original, adapting not just the general contents of the work but all features of the tabular registers. Symeon Seth's On the Handbook of Health by the Balance of the Six Causes contains a partial translation of this work.
Banquet of the Physicians	كتاب دعوة الأطباء	Kitāb Daʿwat al-Aṭibbāʾ	A satirical work dedicated to Naṣr ad-Dawla Abū Naṣr Aḥmād ibn Marwān, the ruler of Māiyafāriqīn. Some scholars claim it is an allegory for Ibn Buṭlān's experiences in Egypt and a commentary of the medical community as a whole and therefore to be understood as an autobiography. (Note: Examples of scholars championing this reading are Conrad, Dagher and Troupeau, and Klein-Franke. Opposing views to this reading can be found in Kennedy's currently unpublished The Doctors' Dinner Party based on Ignacio Sánchez' also currently unpublished work translating the Battle of the Physicians.) Kennedy disagrees with this assessment, but admits the text might contain limited autobigraphical elements. The text is categorized by some in accordance with al-Qifṭī as belonging to the genre of Maqāma. Kennedy remarks on the great variety of styles and influences present in the work. He also notes that Ibn Buṭlān had called it simply an epistle. Hence Kennedy chooses to characterize it as: "a roman à clef, a novella, a drama, a skit, all flowing between registers of language and tone". Some scholars argue it was written in Constantinople. Kennedy however argues the work was composed "during [Ibn Buṭlān's] time in Cairo, or even before he arrived there". Medieval translations into Judeo-Arabic exist. An Arabic edition and English translation, by Philip F. Kennedy and Jeremy Farrell, was published by the Library of Arabic Literature in 2023 under the title of The Doctors' Dinner Party. The Arabic text is freely available online.
Banquet of the Priests	كتاب دعوة القسوس	Kitāb Daʿwat al-Qusūs	Work at times falsely attributed to its literary main character. Contains sharp rhetoric directed at monophysite beliefs.
Battle of the Physicians	كتاب وقعة الأطباء	Kitāb Waqʿat al-Aṭibbāʾ	Mentioned by Ibn Abī Uṣaibiʿa. Currently being edited by Ignacio Sánchez.
Essay on the Holy Eucharist	مقالة في القربان‌ المقدس‌	Maqāla fī-'l-Qurbān al-Muqaddas	Extensive purely theological work ignored by most Muslim literary historians but preserved in its entirety by the Copt Petrus Ibn al-Rāhib (Arabic: بطرس إبن أبي الكرم إبن المهذّب أبو شاكر ابن الراهب, romanized: Buṭrus ibn Abī 'l-Karam ibn al-Muhaḏḏab Abū Šākir ibn al-Rāhib) in his theological Summa. Concerned with a debate about the acceptability of Azymes during the Holy Eucharist by the delegates of Pope Leo IX sent to Patriarch Michael I Cerularius in Constantinople. As Ibn Buṭlān explains in his introduction the Patriarch had ordered him to write this work who wanted to learn about the Nestorian perspective on the issue and therefore opposes the use of Azymes. The work states that it was written during travels and this appears to be the case given for example that Ibn Buṭlān clearly lacked access to an Arabic Bible during its writing and freely quoted the relevant Bible verses with some linguistic corruptions.
Introduction to the Gospels	مقدمة الإناجيل	Muqaddima 'l-Inǧīl	Manuscript previously held by Pater Qusanṭīn Ḫuḍarī Arabic: قسنطين خضري in Aleppo.
Compendium for the Monasteries and the Monks or On the Management of Diseases for the Most Part Through Common Foodstuffs and Available Medications, Specifically for the Benefit of Monks of the Monasteries and Whoever is Far from the city, That Which the Physician Should be Knowledgeable Of	كناش الأديرة والرهبان or في تدبير الامراض العارضة على الاكثار من الاغذية المعلوفة والادوية الموصوفة لينتفع بها رهبان الاديرة ومن بعد عن المدينة ما ینبغي أن یعرفه الطبیب	Kunnāš al-Adyira wa-'r-Ruhbān or Fī tadbīr al-Amrāḍ al-'Āriḍa 'alā 'l-Akṯār min al-Aġḏīa 'l-Ma'lūfa wa-'l-Adwīa 'l-Mawṣufa li-Yantafʿu bi-hā ruhbān al-Adyira wa-man baʿuda ʿan al-Madīna mā yanbaġī an ʾaʿrifuhu 'ṭ-Ṭabīb	This work was written by Ibn Buṭlān for an isolated community of monks which did not have access to urban medical care at a bīmāristān (hospital), it contains 44 chapters in which it details easily available foods and medicines to cure common diseases; while the title suggests it was written for a community of monks it aims to be a self-help medical work directed at a much broader audience, hence Ibn Buṭlān acknowledges that most people have no interest in reading unabridged medical literature and produces a slim and easy to understand text in the style of Arabic: كتاب إلى من لا يحضره الطبيب, romanized: Kitāb ilā man lā yaḥḍuruhu 'ṭ-Ṭabīb, lit. 'Book for Someone Who Cannot Consult the Physician' by ar-Rāzī. It contains an abbrigment of Ibn Sīna's Canon of Medicine, rewritten away from an encyclopedic to a more easily accessible style.
Essay Addressed to ʿAlī ibn Riḍwān or The Egyptian Essay	مقالة إلى علي بن رضوان or المقالة المصرية	Maqāla ilā ʿAlī bin Riḍwān or al-Maqāla 'l-Miṣrīya	Response to a slanderous essay written by ʿAlī ibn Riḍwān against Ibn Buṭlān; Third of the five missives between them.
Book on the Purchase of Slaves and Inspecting Mamluks and Maidservants	كتاب شراء العبيد وتقليب المماليك والجواري	Kitāb Širāʾ al-ʿAbīd wa-Taqlīb al-Mamālīk wa-'l-Ǧawārī	Like the Compendium for the Monasteries and the Monks this work seeks to apply medical knowledge to a practical subject. It is based in a tradition of Roman medical literature. It begins with general advice on purchasing slaves and then goes into detailed explanations, first assessing the general health of a slave, like identifying ones suffering from liver diseases like jaundice based on their yellowish skin, then physiognomic advice on what traits are indicated by what features, then a discussion of what traits are connected to which geographical regions giving pros and cons for the purchase of slave girls from 19 different regions of the world, then the book closes with advice on how to avoid dishonest slave traders and various other comments.
Book on the Introduction into the Field of Medical Science	كتاب المدخل إلى الطب	Kitāb al-Mudḫal ilā 'ṭ-Ṭibb	Mentioned by Ibn Abī Uṣaibiʿa.
Article on Drinking of Purgative Medicines	مقالة في شرب الدواء المسهل	Maqāla fī Šurb al-Adwīāʾ al-Mushil	Mentioned by Ibn Abī Uṣaibiʿa.
Article on how Nutriment Enters the Body, is Digested, and its Waste Expelled, and the Administration of Purgative Medicines and their Composition	مقالة في كيفية دخول الغذاء في البدن وهضمه وخروج فضلاته وسقي الأدوية المسهلة وتركيبها	Maqāla fī Kaifīyat duḫūl al-Ġiḏāʾ fī 'l-Badan wa-Haḍmih wa-Ḫurūǧ Faḍalātih wa-Saqī 'l-Adwīa 'l-Mushila wa-Tarkībihā	Mentioned by Ibn Abī Uṣaibiʿa.
Article on the Reasons the Expert Physicians Changed the Regimen for Most of the Diseases – such as Hemiplegia, Facial Paralysis, Lassitude, and Others – which were, in the Past, Treated with Hot Medicines to Cold Remedies, and by Doing so Went Against the Prescriptions of the Ancients in their Compendia and Medical Formularies	مقالة في علة نقل الأطباء المهرة تدبير أكثر الأمراض التي كانت تعالج قديماً بالأدوية الحارة إلى التدبير المبرد كالفالج واللقوة والاسترخاء وغيرها ومخالفتهم في ذلك لمسطور القدماء في الكنانيش والأقراباذينات	Maqāla fī ʿilla Naql al-Aṭibbāʾ al-Mahara Tadbīr Akṯar al-Amrāḍ al-la-tī Kānat Tuʿālaǧ Qadīman bi-'l-Adwīa 'l-Ḥārra ilā 'l-Tadbīr al-Mubarrad ka-'l-Fāliǧ wa-'l-Laqwa wa-'l-Istirḫāʾ wa-Ġairihā wa-Muḫālafatihim fī Ḏālika li-Masṭūr al-Qudamāʾ fī 'l-Kanānīš wa-'l-Aqrābāḏīnāt	This article covers the change of treatment mentioned in its title and how it gradually occurred in the Iraq and its surrounding regions between the years 377AH/987 AD and 455 AH/1063 AD; Central character of the treatise is Ibn ʿAbdūs of al-ʿAḍudī Hospital and his successes in employing and encouraging the use of cold remedies in the hospital. Ibn Buṭlān authored this treatise in Antioch in 455 AH/1063 AD, while he had begun to build the hospital there; it also mentions details about Aleppo like its cold weather and old houses, curiously Ibn Buṭlān writes not that he observed this himself, but that he was reported these details by Arabic: مشايخ المدينة, romanized: mašāyiḫ al-Madīna, lit. 'master teachers of the city'
Essay on Objections, against those who said that the Chick is Warmer than the Young of the [Flying] Bird, using the Manner of Rationality	مقالة في الاعتراض على من قال إن الفرخ أحر من الفروج بطريق منطقية	Maqāla fī 'l-Iʿtirāḍ ʿalā min Qāla in al-Farḫ Aḥarr min al-Furūǧ bi-Ṭarīq Manṭiqīya	Begin of Ibn Buṭlān's and Ibn Riḍwān's uncivil debate; supposedly reconciling differences between Galen's medical teachings and Aristotle's teachings about the relation of warmth and movement, however Ibn Buṭlān in this work writes three times that the question itself is nothing more than a thought experiment for experts and an exercise for students. Addresses 81 questions concerning eggs and brooding such as "why do black animals lay white eggs from which hatch black young". The text was written in al-Fusṭāṭ, in 441 AH/1049 AD.
Article on Treating a Child Suffering from Stones	مقالة في مداواة صبي عرضت له حصاة	Maqāla fī Mudāwa Ṣabī ʿAraḍat la-hu ḥaṣwā	Mentioned by Ibn Abī Uṣaibiʿa. Stones referenced in the title refer to bladder or kidney stones.
Compendium on Galen	مختصر جالينوس	Muḫtaṣar Ǧālīnūs	Last held by Rampur State Library.
Book of the Springtime	كتاب الربيع	Kitāb ar-Rabīʿ	Written by Muḥammad Ġars an-Niʿma aṣ-Ṣabi son of Hilāl aṣ-Ṣabi extensively quotes the missives sent to Hilāl by Ibn Buṭlān; now lost, but quoted by al-Qifṭī, Ibn Abī Uṣaibiʿa, and Usāma ibn Munqiḏ.
