= Martha, mother of Simeon Stylites the Younger =

Saint Martha
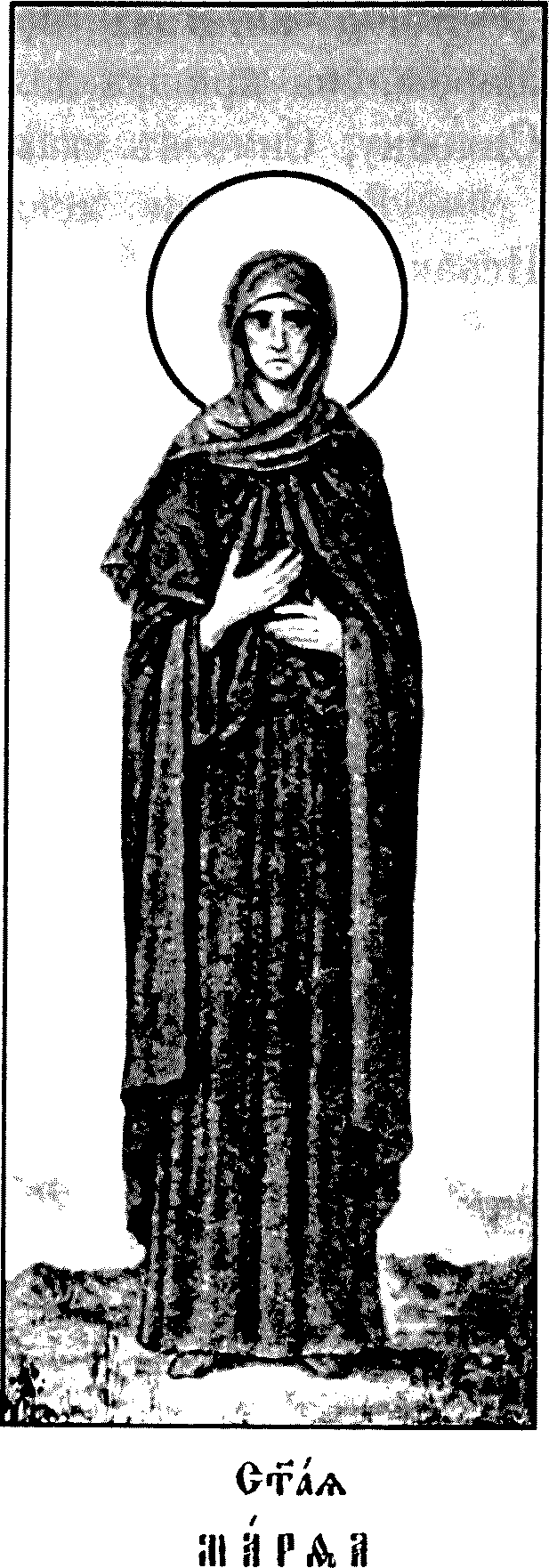
- Born: unknown Antioch
- Died: 551
- Venerated in: Eastern Orthodox Church; Catholic Church
- Feast: July 4 / July 5

Saint Martha (Greek: Ἁγία Μάρθα; died 551) was the mother of Simeon Stylites the Younger. She is venerated in the Eastern Orthodox Church on July 4 and in the Catholic Church on July 5.

== Biography ==
When her parents betrothed her to a young man, she seriously considered leaving home and withdrawing from the world. However, John the Baptist is said to have appeared to her and advised her to do as her parents had arranged and marry the man to whom they had betrothed her. Simeon Stylites was the child of this marriage.

She is said to have risen at midnight for prayer every night. She regularly helped those in need, visited the poor and orphans, and attended to the sick.

In the year before her death, she is said to have seen a number of angels with candles in their hands and to have learned the time of her upcoming death from them. The vision prompted her to even greater dedication to prayer and good works.

She died in 551 AD, and was buried near her son.

There have been many reports of her appearing to various people since her death, generally to heal the sick and offer instruction to people. The most noted of these was to an abbot of the monastery founded by her son. The abbot placed a votive candle on her grave with the instruction that the light never be allowed to be extinguished. Martha appeared to him saying that when the abbot burned a light on her grave, he was asking her to pray to the Lord for him.

== Sources ==
- Prolog:July 4 of the Western American Diocese of the Serbian Orthodox Church
