= Tacuinum Sanitatis =

Medieval handbook on health and wellbeing

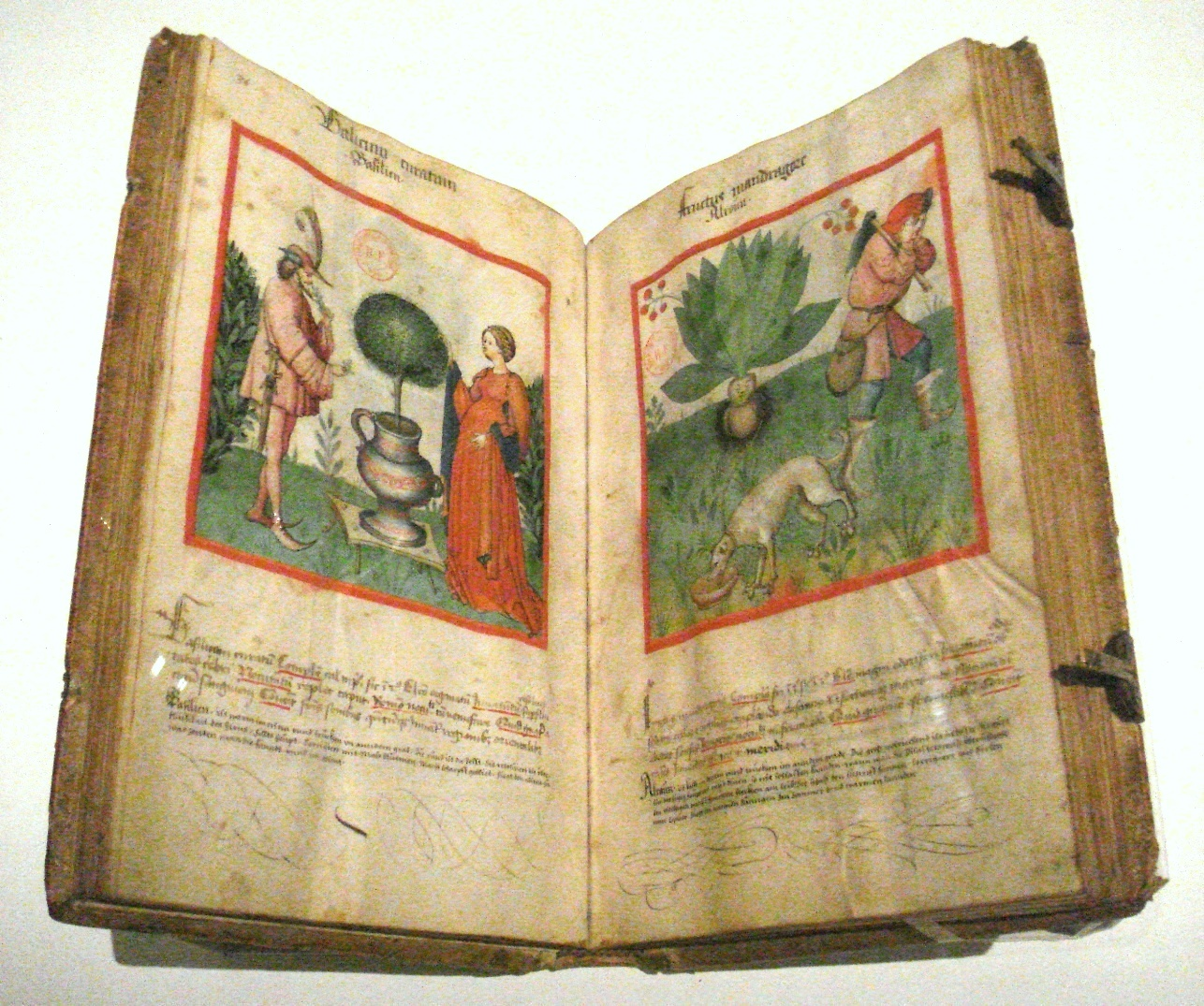
- Ibn Butlan's Tacuinum sanitatis, Rhineland, 2nd half of 15th c.
- Author: Ibn Butlan
- Original title: Taqwīm as‑Siḥḥa
- Language: Arabic, Latin
- Subjects: health and wellbeing
- Genres: medical
- Publication date: 11th century
- Publication place: Baghdad under Abbasid Caliphate
- Text: Tacuinum Sanitatis online

The Taccuinum Sanitatis is a medieval handbook mainly on health aimed at a cultured lay audience. Originally an 11th-century Arab medical treatise composed by Ibn Butlan of Baghdad under the name of Taqwīm aṣ‑Ṣiḥḥa (Arabic: تقويم الصحة, lit. 'Tabular Register of Health'), in the West, the work is known by the Latinized name taken by its translations: Tacuinum (sometimes Taccuinum) Sanitatis. The text exists in several variant Latin versions, the manuscripts of which are profusely illustrated. Numerous European versions were made in increasing numbers in the 14th and 15th centuries.

== History ==
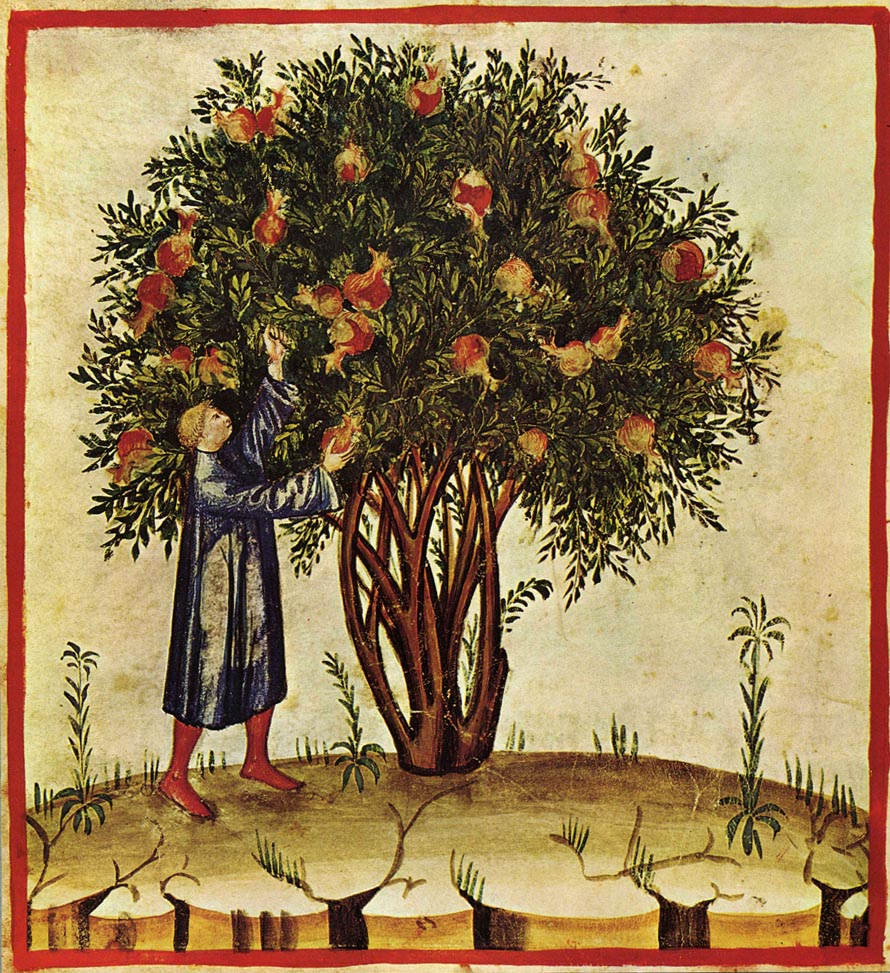
Tacuinum Sanitatis, Lombardy, late 14th century (Biblioteca Casanatense, Rome).

The British Library possesses in its Oriental Manuscripts collection a presentation copy of Taqwīm as‑Siḥḥa from 1213 copied in Arabic for al-Malik al-Ẓāhir, son of Saladin.

The terse paragraphs of the treatise were freely translated into Latin in mid-13th century Palermo or Naples, which continued an Italo-Norman tradition as one of the prime sites for peaceable intercultural contact between the Islamic and European worlds. One translation was made in King Manfred of Sicily's court between 1254 and 1266. "Magister Faragius" (Ferraguth) in Naples took responsibility for one translation into Latin, in a manuscript in the Bibliothèque Nationale, Paris, MS Lat. 15362 (noted by Witthoft 1978:58 note 9).

Four handsomely illustrated, complete, late 14th-century manuscripts of the Tacuinum, all produced in Lombardy, survive, in Vienna, Paris, Liège and Rome, as well as scattered illustrations from others, as well as 15th-century codices. Carmelia Opsomer published a commented facsimile of the ms 1041 held in the library of the university of Liège. Unillustrated manuscripts present a series of tables, with a narrative commentary on the facing pages. The Tacuinum was first printed in 1531.

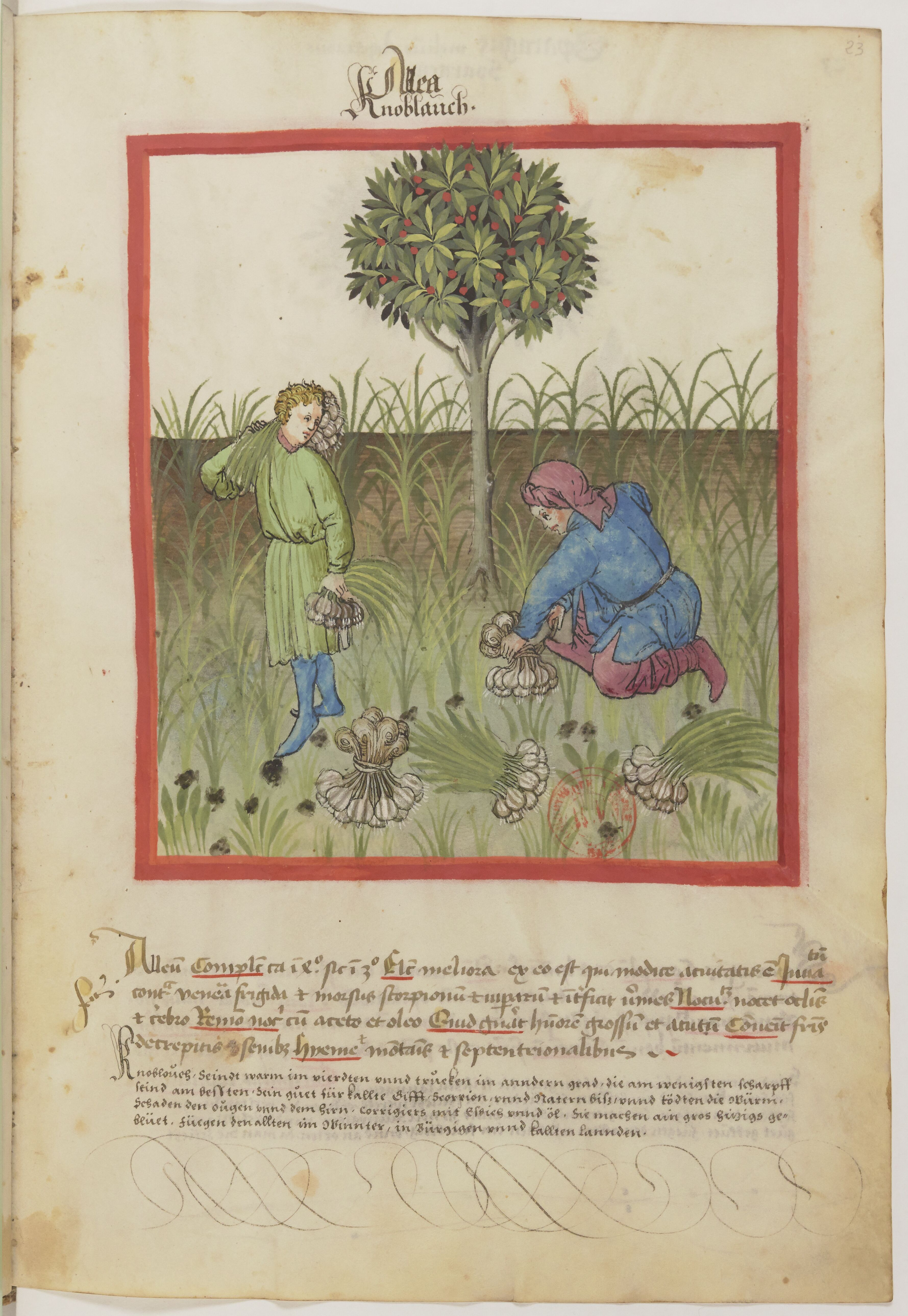
Harvesting garlic, from Tacuinum Sanitatis, c. 1400 (Bibliothèque nationale, Paris)

The Tacuinum was very popular in Western Europe in the Late Middle Ages; an indication of that popularity is the use of the word taccuino in modern Italian to mean "notebook". "Neither religious nor scientific motives could explain the incentive to create such an image; only a cultured lay audience [...] could have commissioned and then perused these delightful pages."

In addition to its importance for the study of medieval medicine, the Tacuinum is also of interest in the study of agriculture and cooking; for example, one of the earliest identifiable images of the carrot—a modern plant—is found in it.

In 2008, the Spanish publishing house M. Moleiro Editor published the first and only facsimile of the Tacuinum Sanitatis kept at the Bibliothèque nationale de France, in an edition limited to 987 copies. This edition was accompanied by a commentary volume by Alain Touwaide (Smithsonian), Eberhard König (Freie Universität Berlin) and Carlos Miranda García-Tejedor (Doctor in History).

== Structure and content ==
Though describing in detail the beneficial and harmful properties of foods and plants, it is far more than a herbal. Listing its contents organically rather than alphabetically, it sets forth the six essential elements for well-being:

- sufficient food and drink in moderation,
- fresh air,
- alternations of activity and rest,
- alternations of sleep and wakefulness,
- secretions and excretions of humours, and finally
- the effects of states of mind.

Tacuinum Sanitatis says that illnesses result from imbalance of these elements.

Depending on the translation, the Tacuinum Sanitatis consists of a number of horticulture remedies for a variety of conditions and circumstances. One compilation of the Tacuinum Sanitatis that combines the text from all four of the existing manuscripts includes forty-eight different vegetables, fruits, and clothes. Each of the sections isolates a single remedy and considers the ways that the remedy is useful, the possible consequences, methods to mitigate the consequences, and the beneficial qualities.

Although the exact taxonomic classification of each plant is uncertain due to differences between manuscripts and errors during translation, the remedies described in the Tacuinum Sanitatis can still be loosely identified. The manuscripts describe root vegetables, alliums, leafy vegetables, cucurbits, other vegetables, temperate fruits, subtropical fruits, nuts, flowers, herbs, and even clothing material. The exact identity of the plant species are not always certain, as they are often labeled with Arabic words.

There are several categories of vegetables present in the various manuscripts. Root vegetables of the manuscripts include radishes (Rafani), turnips (rappe), parsnips (pastinace), and carrots (also pastinace). The alliums represented are onions (cepe), leeks (pori), and garlic (alea). The leaf vegetables included are kale (caules onati), lettuce (lactuce), and spinach (spinachie). Cucumber (cucumeres et citruli), melon (melones indi et palestini), watermelon (Melones dulces/insipidi), and bottle gourd (cucurbite) are present for the Cucurbitaceae. Other vegetables include asparagus (sparagus), cowpea (faxioli), and eggplant (melongiana).

Another main category within the manuscripts is fruits, including temperate fruits – grape (uve), apple (mala acetosa or mala dulcis), pear (pira), peach (persica), and cherry (cerosa acetosa or cerosa dulcia) – and subtropical fruits – lemon (citra) and pomegranate (granata acetosa).

Other items beyond vegetables and fruits are presented as remedies for conditions, such as nuts, flowers, and herbs. These remedies include chestnut (castanee), hazelnut (avelane), rose (roxe), lily (lilia), violet (viole), sage (salvia), marjoram (maiorana), and dill (aneti). However, the above examples are not a comprehensive list of every remedy included in all of the manuscript editions—some of these items are included in multiple manuscripts, whereas others are missing or additional remedies included.

Within each entry of a remedy, a few qualities and uses are explained. The optimal state of the plant for medicinal use is described, such as the quality of the plant leaves. The entries include not only the benefits from the item, but also the potential dangers from using the remedy, similar to a list of side effects from modern medicine. However, the dangers described can be mitigated by a neutralizing element that is also included. Additionally, there is also typically an image corresponding to the item that is prescribed.

The detailed images that accompany each remedy typically offer skewed depictions of the agricultural process, including placing too much emphasis on plant size and production, although these drawings exhibit better quality depictions of agriculture than similar images from that time. Many of the images depict people in the process of harvesting the crop instead of administering the remedy from the plant. Thus, there is a degree to which horticulture is also presented alongside the medicinal qualities of plants, however, the quality of the depictions can make identifying the species difficult.

== Bibliography ==
- Janick, Jules; Daunay, Marie Christine; Paris, Harry (November 2010). "Horticulture and Health in the Middle Ages: Images from the Tacuinum Sanitatis". HortScience. 45 (11): 1592–1596. doi:10.21273/HORTSCI.45.11.1592. S2CID 86510163.
- Henley, David. 'Tacuinum Sanitatis' in: Health and Well Being: A Primitive Medieval Guide. Chiang Mai: Cognoscenti Books, 2013.
- Hoeniger, Kathleen. "The Illuminated Tacuinum Sanitatis Manuscripts from Northern Italy ca. 1380-1400: Sources, Patrons, and the Creation of a New Pictorial Genre." In Visualizing Medieval Medicine and Natural History, 1200-1550, eds. Jean Ann Givens, Karen Reeds, Alain Touwaide, 51–81. Aldershot, UK: Ashgate, 2006.
- Opsomer, C., ed. L’Art de vivre en santé. Images et recettes du Moyen Âge. Le « Tacuinum sanitatis » (ms 1041) de la Bibliothèque universitaire de Liège. Liège, 1991.
- Wickersheimer, E. "Les Tacuini Sanitatis et leur traduction allemande par Michel Herr", Bibliothèque d'Humanisme et Renaissance 12 1950:85-97.
- Witthoft, Brucia. "The Tacuinum Sanitatis: A Lombard Panorama." Gesta 17, no. 1 (1978) :49-60.
