= Abu al-Hasan al-Harrani =

10th century Iranian physician

Abu al-Hasan al-Harrani, Thabit ibn Ibrahim ibn Zahrun al-Ḥarrani (Arabic: أبو الحسن ثابت بن إبراهيم بن زهرون الحراني) (b. Raqqa 896; d. Baghdad 980), was a 10th-century physician and translator who lived and worked in Baghdad at the court of its Buyid rulers.

== Biography ==
Not much is known about his life. He was born in Raqqa to a family of learned physicians who were originally Sabians from Harran. He was a contemporary to Ibn Butlan whom he met in Baghdad, and became one of his tutors. His works include a medical commentary on Yahya ibn Sarafyun's book "al-Kunnash", as mentioned by Ibn Abi Usaibia. Al-Harrani died in Baghdad in 980, aged 84.

== See also ==
- Category:Sabian scholars from the Abbasid Caliphate
- Medicine in the medieval Islamic world
