= Simeon Stylites the Younger =

Antiochian Christian stylite and saint (521–596)

Saint Simeon Stylites the Younger
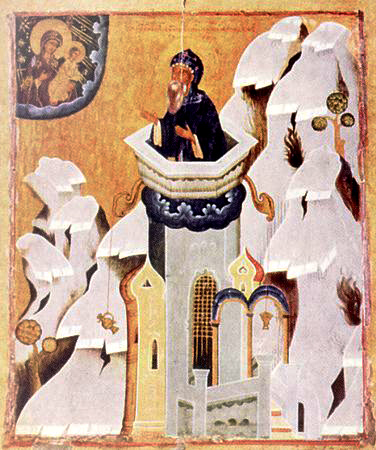
- Eastern Orthodox icon of Simeon Stylites
- Born: 521; Antioch (modern-day Antakya, Hatay, Turkey)
- Died: 24 May 596 or 597
- Venerated in: Catholic Church and Eastern Orthodox Church

Simeon Stylites the Younger, also known as Simeon of the Admirable Mountain (Greek: Συμεὼν ὁ νεώτερος ὁ στυλίτης, Arabic: مار سمعان العمودي الأصغر mār semʻān l-ʻamūdī l-asghar; 521 – 596/597), is a saint in the Catholic Church and Eastern Orthodox Church.

== Life ==
Stylites were solitaries who, taking up their abode upon the tops of a pillar (stylos), chose to spend their days amid the restraints thus entailed and in the exercise of other forms of asceticism.

Simeon was born at Antioch in 521. His father, John, was a native of Edessa, and his mother, named Martha was afterward revered as a saint. When Simeon was six years of age, his father was killed in an earthquake, after which he and his mother moved to the outskirts of the city.

Like his namesake, Simeon seems to have been drawn very young to a life of austerity. He attached himself to a community of ascetics living within the mandra or enclosure of another pillar-hermit, named John, who acted as their spiritual director. Simeon while still only a boy had a pillar erected for himself close to that of John. In a letter to Thomas, guardian of the True Cross at Jerusalem, Simeon states that he was living upon a pillar when he lost his first teeth. In the course of this period, however, he several times moved to a new pillar, and on the occasion of the first of these exchanges, the Patriarch of Antioch and the Bishop of Seleucia ordained him deacon during the short space of time he spent upon the ground. For his efforts, Simeon is said to have received from God the gift of healing. For eight years until John died, Simeon remained near his master's column, so near that they could easily converse. During this period his austerities were kept in some sort of check by the older hermit.

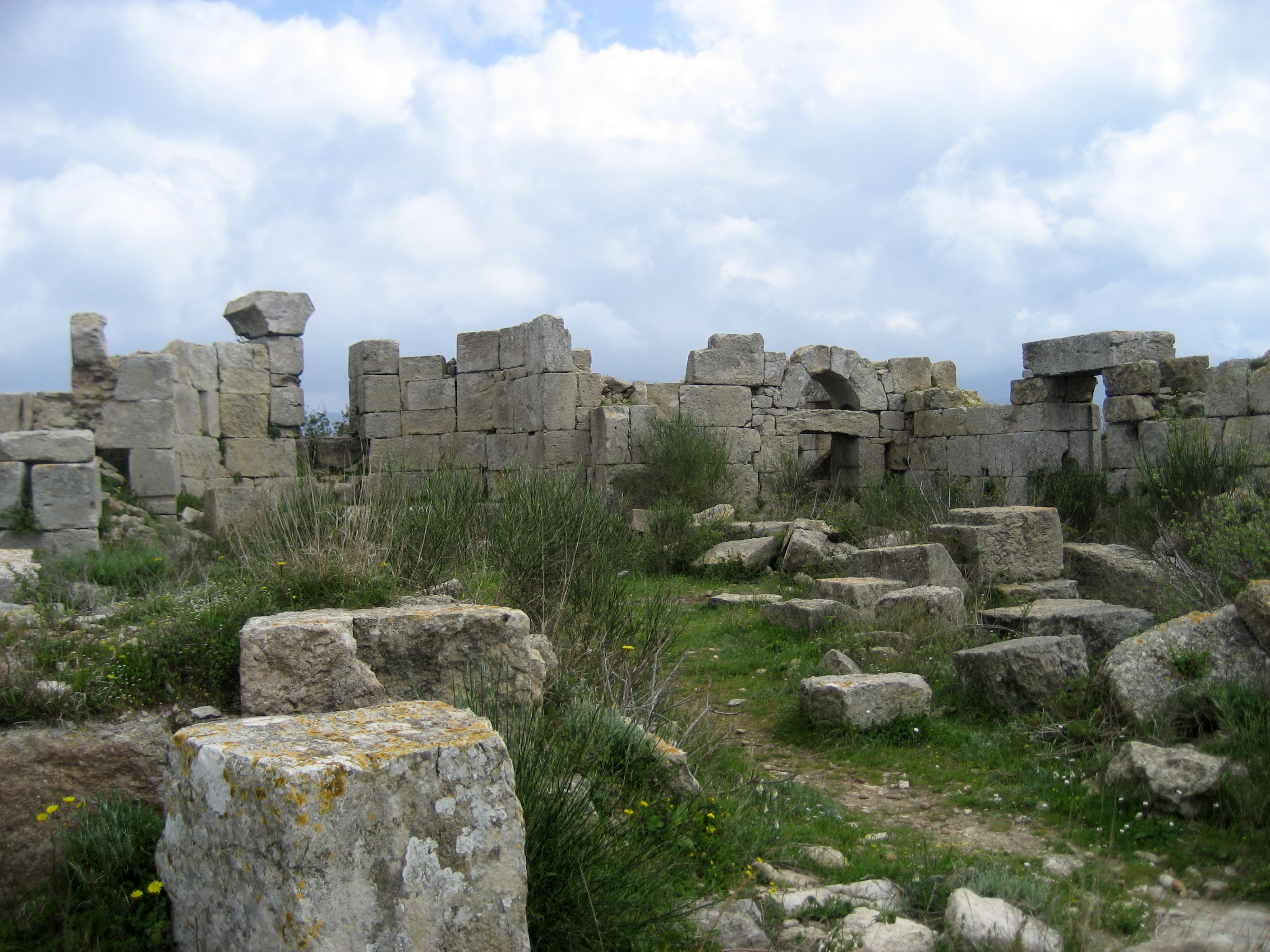
Monastery, showing the remains of St. Simeon's pillar

After John's death, Simeon gave full rein to his ascetical practices. From the rising of the sun until mid-afternoon, he read books and copied Holy Scripture. Simeon the younger was ordained priest and was thus able to offer the Holy Sacrifice in memory of his mother. On such occasions, his disciples one after another climbed up the ladder to receive Communion at his hands. As in the case of most of the other pillar saints, a large number of miracles were believed to have been worked by Simeon the Younger. In several instances, the cure was effected by pictures representing him. Evagrius was an eyewitness to many marvels, and says that he had experienced Simeon's knowledge of the thoughts of others when he visited him for spiritual advice. Simeon maintained this kind of life for 68 years. Towards the close of his life the saint occupied a column upon a mountainside near Antioch called the "Hill of Wonders" (due to his miracles), also known as the "Wondrous Mountain" or the "Admirable Mountain" (Classical Syriac: ܛܘܪܐ ܕܬܕܡܪܬܐ, Ṭūrā d-ṯeḏmūrtā; Greek: Θαυματόν Ὄρος, Thaumaton Oros); this mountain is known today in Turkish as Samandağı (modern Arabic name: جبل سمعان, Jabal Simʻān or جبل ليلون, Jabal Laylūn) and is located near the town of Samandağ, Turkey. It was here that he died in 596.

Besides the letter mentioned, several writings are attributed to the younger Simeon. There is also an "Apocalypse" and letters to the Emperors Justinian I and Justin II. More especially Simeon was the reputed author of a certain number of liturgical hymns.

== Veneration ==
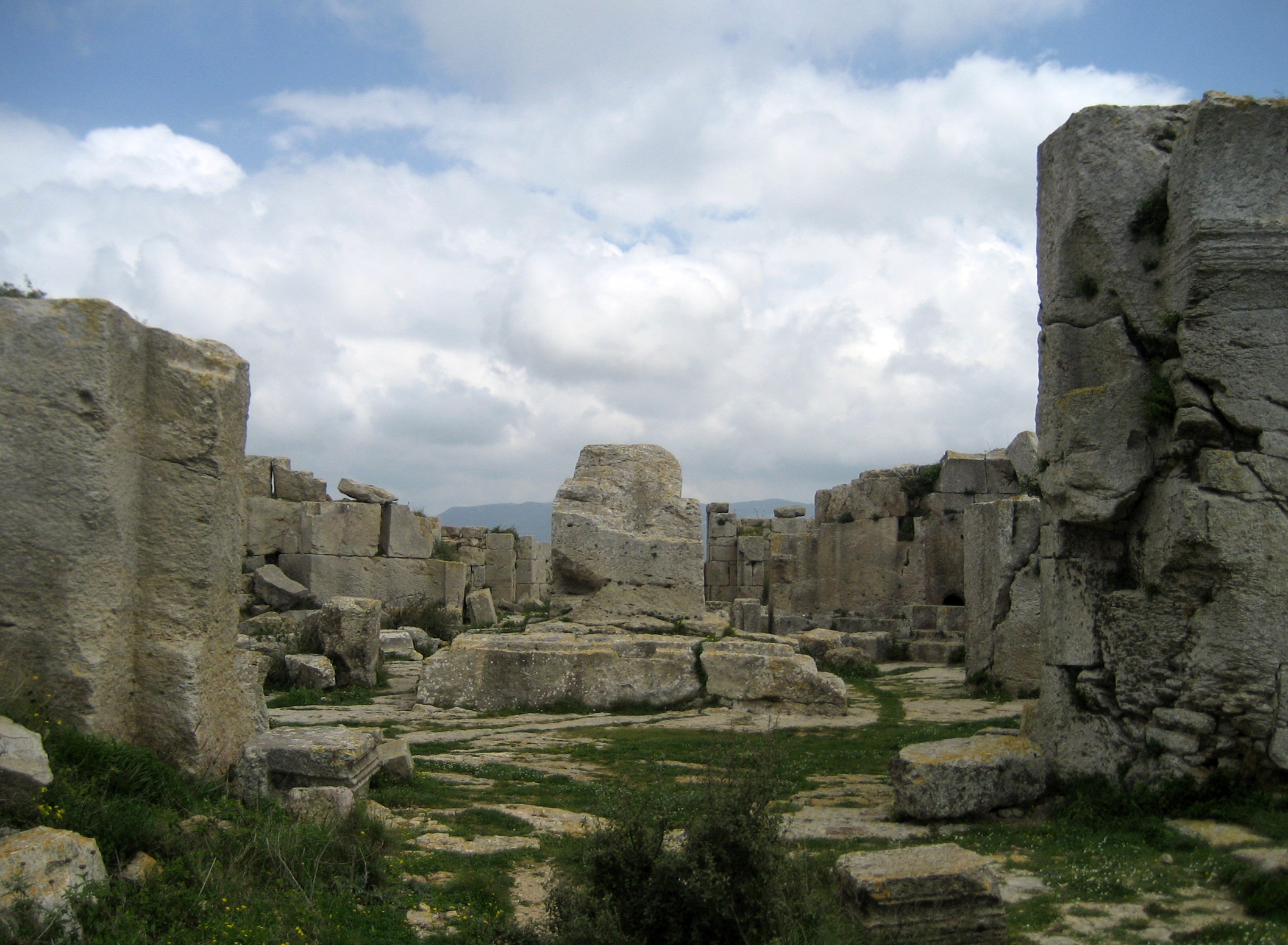
Monastery of Saint Simeon Stylites the Younger

The Monastery of Saint Simeon Stylites the Younger commemorates Simeon and marks the last of several pillars on top of which he lived during his life. According to one account, he lived on this pillar for the final 45 years of his long life and preached from the top of it. Miraculous healings were attributed to him and he was venerated as a saint even while he was still alive. The Emperor Maurice of Constantinople held him in great esteem. The sick people he had healed built a church in gratitude. Until the thirteenth century, the place was a pilgrimage destination.

The Wellcome Collection has a tempera on wood painting by an unknown artist of Saint Simeon Stylites the Younger.

St. Simeon of the Wonderful Mountain Church, a Russian Orthodox church in Dresden, Germany, is named after him.

== See also ==
- Monastery of Saint Simeon Stylites the Younger
