= Monastery of Saint Simeon Stylites the Younger =

Monastery in Turkey

Coordinates: 36.0917°N 36.0356°E

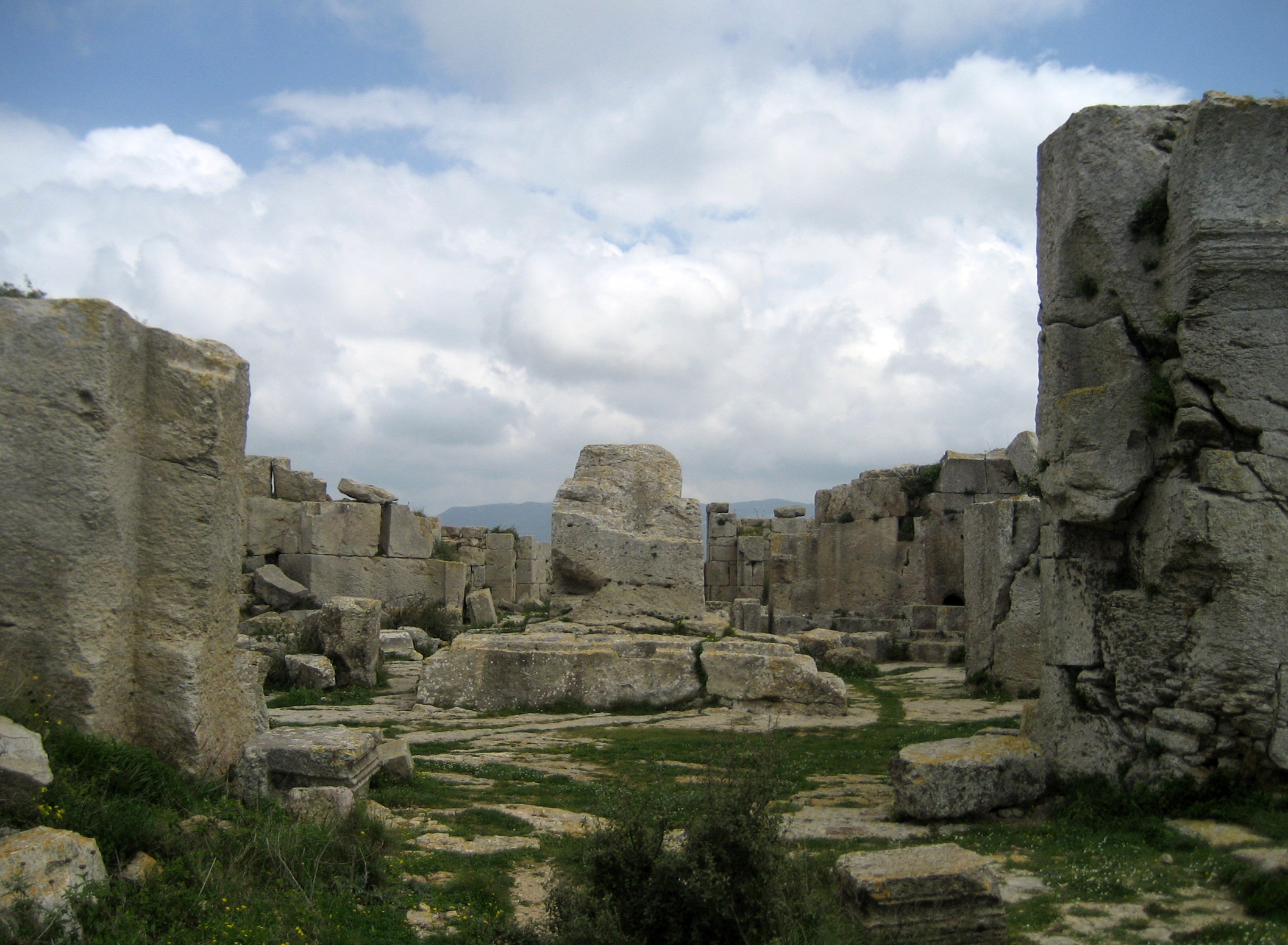
Monastery, showing the remains of St. Simeon's pillar

The Monastery of Saint Simeon Stylites the Younger (Turkish: Aziz Simon manastır) is a former Christian monastery that lies on a hill roughly 29 kilometres (18 miles) southwest of Antakya and six kilometres (3.7 miles) to the east of Samandağ, in the southernmost Turkish province of Hatay. The site is extensive but the monastery buildings are in ruins.

The monastery sits on top of a hill called Saman Dağı (summit elevation: 479 m (1,572 ft)).

== History ==
The monastery commemorates the "pillar saint", Simeon Stylites the Younger (521–597) and marks the last of several pillars atop which he lived his life. According to one version, he lived on, and preached from, this pillar for the final 45 years of his long life. Miraculous healing was attributed to him, and he was venerated as a saint even while he was still alive. The area was a pilgrimage destination until the thirteenth century.

Ibn Butlan said of the monastery in the mid of the 11th century that its buildings occupied an area as large as half of Baghdad. The monastery was sacked in 1084 during the conquest of Antioch by Suleiman ibn Qutalmish, who attempted to expand his sphere of influence. This led to the dispersal of many monks, such as the author Nikon who complained of the difficulty of maintaining contact with other monasteries under Seljuk occupation. Only after the reconquest of Antioch by the forces of the First Crusade the monastery could be rebuilt and it continued to flourish during most of the 12th and 13th century.

The monastery of Saint Simeon was destroyed by Sultan Baybars during his campaign against Antioch in 1268 and never recovered.

== Description ==
Within the cruciform monastery site, the ruins of three churches can be seen. The first contains the remnants of mosaics while the second was richly ornamented. The third is more basic and was probably used by monks, The base section of the pillar on which Simeon lived can still be seen, surrounded by an octagonal space.

The monastery gave its name to the nearby settlement of Seleucia Pieria, known today by its Turkish name, Samandağ.

== Famous residents ==
- Nikon of the Black Mountain, lived there between c. 1060 and 1084
- George the Recluse, lived there c. 1040, teacher of George the Hagiorite
- Michael al-Simʿānī, lived there c. 1090, translated the Life of John of Damascus into Arabic
- Gerasimos, Christian Arabic writer, abbot sometime between the 9th and 13th centuries
