= Nikon of the Black Mountain =

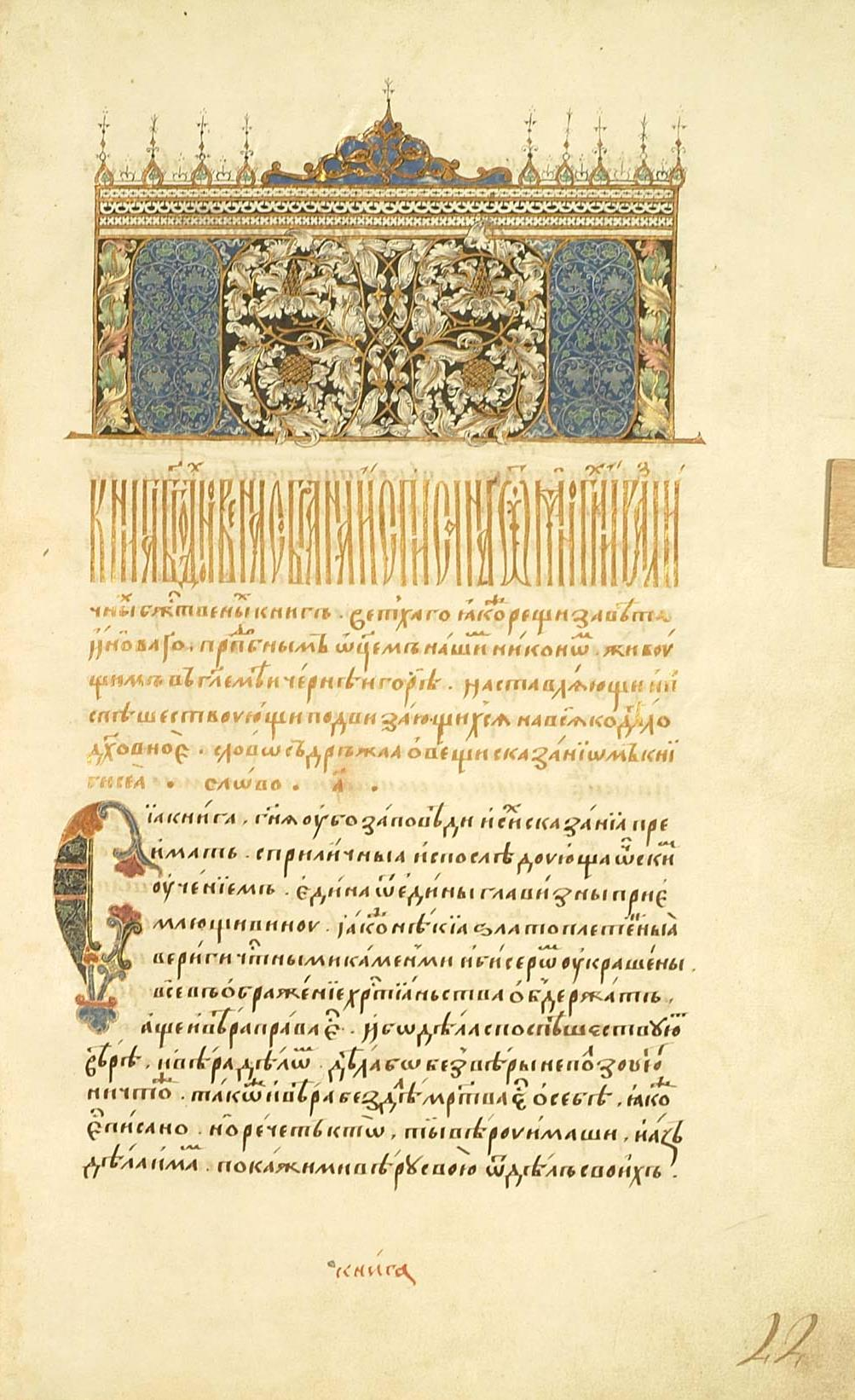
Early 16th-century manuscript of the Slavonic version of the Pandektai

Nikon of the Black Mountain (born c. 1025, died c. 1105) was a Byzantine soldier, monk and author.

Born at Constantinople around 1025 to a family of archontes, Nikon served in the army under Constantine IX (r. 1042–1055). He never received a formal education and considered himself "simple, uncultivated and completely ignorant". Acting on a vision of the Virgin Mary, he retired to a monastery on the Black Mountain founded by Luke, the former metropolitan of Anazarbos, who also tonsured him.

After the death of Luke, Nikon incurred the displeasure of his brother monks by striving to enforce rigid discipline. He was eventually forced to leave. He tried to establish his own monastery, but ultimately settled in the monastery of Simeon Stylites the Younger on the Wondrous Mountain. In 1084, the Sultanate of Rum conquered Antioch and the monastery of Saint Simeon was sacked. For safety, Nikon moved to the monastery of the Theotokos tou Roidiou (Virgin of the Pomegranate), probably identical with the Simanaklay monastery in modern Kazmaca close to Anazarbos. There he died between 1100 and 1110.

Nikon produced two major compilations of ecclesiastical texts: the Pandektai (Pandects), a collection of conciliar and patristic writings on canon law for wandering monks, and the Taktikon, a collection of forty chapters of authoritative texts on liturgical problems. The Pandektai was written while he was still on the Black Mountain. It contains one episode cited to the Euthymiac History, which is one of only two surviving excerpts from this otherwise lost work. The Taktikon includes a typikon initially intended for the community he founded, but they rejected it and the community disbanded. The typikon was taken up by the monastery of the Virgin of the Pomegranate. From the 13th century, the Taktikon was the main authority in Russian monasticism.

Both Nikon's works were early translated into Arabic and Slavonic. The Arabic translation of the Pandektai, entitled al-Ḥāwī al-kabīr, was then translated into Ethiopic under the title Maṣḥafa Ḥāwi in the 16th century.

== Sources ==
- Booth, Phil (2015). "On the Life of the Virgin Attributed to Maximus Confessor" (PDF). The Journal of Theological Studies. 66 (1): 149–203. doi:10.1093/jts/flv003.
- Kazhdan, Alexander (1991). "Nikon of the Black Mountain". In Kazhdan, Alexander (ed.). The Oxford Dictionary of Byzantium. Oxford and New York: Oxford University Press. p. 1484. ISBN 0-19-504652-8.
- Levy-Rubin, Milka (2001). "'The Errors of the Franks' by Nikon of the Black Mountain: Between Religious and Ethno-Cultural Conflict". Byzantion. 71: 422–437.
- Oltean, Daniel (2022). "From the Monastery of the Theotokos tou Roudiou to Simanaklay?: Greek and Armenian Monks in a Changing World". Dumbarton Oaks Papers. 76: 101–116. JSTOR 27172436.
- Sidarus, Adel (2013). "Families of Coptic Dignitaries (buyūtāt) under the Ayyūbids and the Golden Age of Coptic Arabic Literature (13th cent.)" (PDF). Journal of Coptic Studies. 15: 189–208.
