= Gregory IV of Antioch =

Greek Orthodox Patriarch of Antioch

Gregory IV Haddad غريغوريوس الرابع حداد
- Greek Orthodox Patriarch of Antioch and All the East
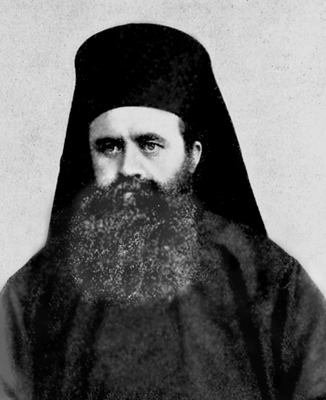
- Church: Greek Orthodox Church of Antioch
- Installed: 1906
- Term ended: 1928
- Predecessor: Meletius II of Antioch
- Successor: Alexander III of Antioch

Personal details
- Born: Ghantus Haddad; July 1, 1859 Ottoman Lebanon
- Died: December 12, 1928 (aged 69) Damascus, Syria

Patriarch Gregory IV (Arabic: البطريرك غريغوريوس الرابع al-Baṭriyark Ġrīġūriyūs ar-Rābiʿ; born Ġanṭūs Ḥaddād غنطوس حداد; July 1, 1859 – December 12, 1928) was the Greek Orthodox Patriarch of Antioch from 1906 to 1928. He was a recipient of the Order of Saint Alexander Nevsky. He was the second Syrian Arabic-speaking patriarch to become Patriarch of Antioch after the position had been held by ethnic Greek bishops for 175 years. In 1913, he was a special guest in St. Petersburg of Tsar Nicholas II of Russia at the three hundredth anniversary of the rise of the Romanov dynasty to power.

== Life ==
Ghantus Haddad was born on July 1, 1859, the son of son of Girjis, son of Ghantus Haddad in the village of Aabey of the Shuf district of Mount Lebanon. He began his education in a village school conducted by an American Protestant Mission. Ghantus developed the desire for a career in the Holy Orders, and as a teenager requested of Archbishop Ghufara’el, who was Metropolitan of Archdiocese of Beirut and Mount Lebanon, to be allowed to join his ecclesiastical school. Receiving the approval of Abp. Ghufara’el, Ghantus joined the school on May 10, 1872. There, he studied under Shahin‘Atatiyyah. Having shown himself a model student who surpassed all other students in academic achievement, Ghantus became the private secretary of Abp. Ghufra’el on December 24, 1875, at the age of sixteen.

On December 19, 1877, he entered the Nuriyyah Monastery with the name Gregory. On August 29, 1879, he was ordained a deacon. With his new dignity, Dcn. Gregory was placed in charge of the St. Paul’s Society which was responsible for aiding the Orthodox Churches and schools of Mount Lebanon. He continued with this responsibility until the St. Paul’s Society was dissolved when the Archdiocese was split into two: that of Beirut and Mount Lebanon in 1901. In 1883, Gregory was made editor and published the Orthodox newspaper Al-Haddiyah.

In May 1890, Gregory was elected Archbishop of Tripoli. He was consecrated by Patriarch Gerasimos of Antioch shortly before Gerasimos moved to the Patriarchate of Jerusalem. As Archbishop of Tripoli, Gregory led with love and dedication to the common good, and soon healed the divisions that had grown under his predecessor Abp. Sofronios Najjar. Under his leadership, Orthodox life in Tripoli grew, including new churches, schools, and charitable organizations. Among the schools he founded was that of Kiftin which from 1893 to 1897 produced many of the learned men of this period.

On June 29, 1906, Abp. Gregory was elected by the Holy Synod of the Church of Antioch as Patriarch and successor to Malatius II. His consecration took place on August 26, 1906 in the Patriarchal Church of the Virgin in Damascus. With his consecration as patriarch, Patr. Gregory IV became the second Arab to ascend to the see of Antioch after it had been occupied by ethnic Greek hierarchs for 175 years, from 1724 to 1899, that is from the ascension of Sylvester the Cypriot to the deposition of Spiridon in 1898.

As a result the election of Arab patriarchs, the Greek Patriarchs of Constantinople, Alexandria and Jerusalem did not recognized the elections of Malatius and Gregory to the Patriarchal see because they were not ethnic Greeks. After a decade, however, the patriarchs changed their position. On August 14, 1909, the Patriarch of Constantinople, Joachim III, sent a letter to Gregory recognizing his election and established communion with him. The Patriarch of Jerusalem followed suit on September 29. Having commended Gregory on his virtues and honesty, their acceptance of Gregory's election ended the ethnic conflict over the See of Antioch.

With his enthronement, Gregory began a campaign to invigorate the patriarchate. He gave special attention to the improvement of education, including schools and especially that of Balamand Monastery. He founded the Al-Ni’mah magazine which became the official publication of the Patriarchate. His efforts included renovation of the Patriarchate, including church property, and filling vacant archbishoprics with qualified archbishops.

A highlight of his patriarchate was an official invitation from Tsar Nicholas II of Russia asking him to preside over religious ceremonies starting March 6, 1913 in the capital of Russia, St. Petersburg, that marked the three hundred year anniversary of the rise of the Romanovs to power. On this occasion, Tsar Nicholas issued a statement which said: "Because of the strong historical relations which existed between our predecessors, the Tsars of Russia, and the patriarchs of Antioch, we have decided to extend an invitation to His Beatitude, Patriarch Gregory of Antioch to preside over the religious ceremonies which will begin on February 21, 1913 (os), commemorating three hundred years of Romanov rule in Russia."

Patriarch Gregory IV reposed on December 12, 1928.

== Sources ==
- Gregory Haddad
- The Modern Antiochian Renaissance

== Literature ==
- Hage, Wolfgang (2007). Das orientalische Christentum. Stuttgart: Kohlhammer Verlag. ISBN 9783170176683.

Preceded by Meletius II of Antioch	Eastern Orthodox Patriarch of Antioch; 1906–1928	Succeeded by Alexander III of Antioch
