= List of Greek Orthodox patriarchs of Antioch =

The patriarch of Antioch is one of the Eastern Orthodox patriarchs, the leader of the autocephalous Greek Orthodox Church of Antioch. The term "Greek" does not refer to ethnic origin; the majority of these patriarchs were not ethnic Greeks, but rather Hellenized Arabs, Arameans, Assyrians, and other Levantines who spoke Greek and adopted a Hellenic identity. It refers to the fact that this church follows the Chalcedonian Orthodoxy associated with the (Greek-speaking) Byzantine Empire. Since 518, there have been two patriarchs of Antioch who call themselves Orthodox: the Chalcedonian ones listed here, and the non-Chalcedonian Syriac Orthodox patriarchs of Antioch.

== Greek Orthodox patriarchs of Antioch from 518 to 1724 ==
- Paul II the Jew (519–521)
- Euphrasius (521–526)
- Ephraim of Amid (527–545)
- Domninus (545–559)
- Anastasius I (559–570), first time
- Gregory (570–593)
- Anastasius I (593–598), second time
- Anastasius II (599–609)

Vacant 30 years

- Macedonius (639–after 649)
- George I (?–?)
- Macarius I (?–681)
- Theophanes (681–?)
- Thomas (?–685?)
- George II (685?–702?)
- Stephen III (742/3–744/5)
- Theophylact Bar Qānbara (744/5–750)
- Theodore I (750/1–773/4)
- Theodoret (before 787–?)
- Job (813/4–844/5)
- Two rival patriarchs:
  - Nicholas I (845–867)
  - Eustathius II (845–861×869)
- Stephen IV (870)
- Theodosius I (870–890)
- Simeon I (892–907)
- Elias I (907–934)
- Theodosius II (936–943)
- Theocharistus (944–948)
- Agapius I (952/3-959/60)
- Christopher (960–969)
- Eustratius (969)
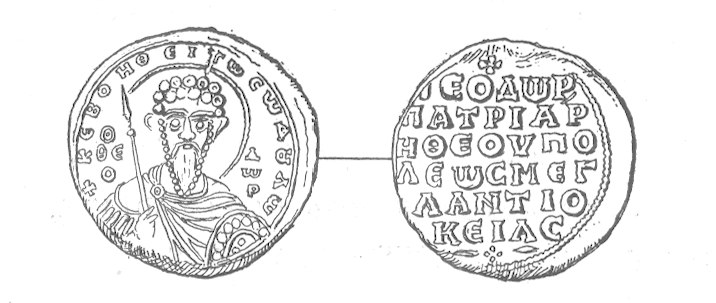
  Seal of Theodore II (Theodore of Koloneia)
- Theodore II of Koloneia (970–976)
- Agapius II (978–996)
- John III (996–1021)
- Nicholas II (1025–1030)
- Elias II (1032–1033)
- Theodore III (1034–1042)
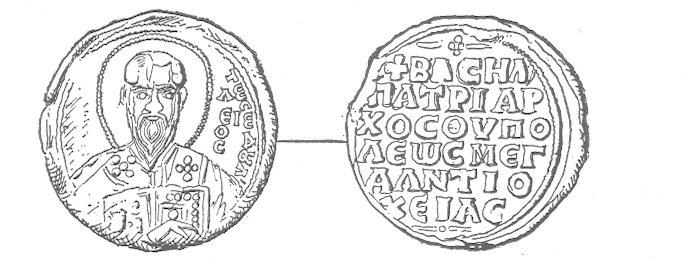
  Seal of Basil II
- Basil II (?-?)
- Peter III (1052–1056)
- John IV (1056–1057), also called Dionysius I
- Theodosius III (1057–after 1059)
- Aemilian (1074–1079/80)
- Nicephorus the Black (1079/80–?)
- John V (or IV) (1091–1100)

After 1098, the patriarchate was in exile, at first at Constantinople, having been replaced by a Latin patriarch.

- John VI (or V) (1106–1134)
- Luke (1137/8–1156)
- Soterichos Panteugenos (1156–1157), elect
- Athanasius I Manasses (1157–1171)
- Cyril II (fl. 1173–1179)
- Theodosius? (1180–1182)
- Theodore IV Balsamon (before 1189–1195 or later)
- Simeon II (before 1206–after 1235)
- David (?–?)
- Euthymius I (before 1258–c. 1274)
- Theodosius V of Villehardouin (1275–1283/4)
- Arsenius (1283/4–c. 1286)
- Two rival patriarchs:
  - Cyril III (fl. 1287–c. 1308)
  - Dionysius I (or II) (1287–1316)
- Cyril IV (?–?)
- Dionysius II (or III) (?–?)
- Sophronius (?–?)
- Ignatius II (1344–before 1359)
- Pachomius I (before 1359–1368), first time
- Michael I (1368–1375)
- Pachomius I (1375–1377), second time
- Mark I (1377–1378)
- Pachomius I (1378–1386), third time
- Nilus or Nikon (before 1388–1395)
- Michael II (1395–1412)
- Pachomius II (1412)
- Joachim I (?–1424/5)
- Mark II (1426/7–?)
- Dorotheus I (1434/5–1451)
- Michael III (1451–1456?)
- Mark III (1456?–1457/8)
- Joachim I (1458–1459 or after)
- Michael IV (c. 1470/4–before 1484)
- Dorotheus II (before 1484–after 1500)
- Michael V (1523–1541)
- Dorotheus III (1541–1543)
- Joachim IV Ibn Juma (1543–1576)
- Michael VI Sabbagh (1577–1581)
- Joachim V (1581–1592)
- Joachim VI (1593–1604)
- Dorotheus IV (or V) Ibn Al-Ahmar (1604–1611)
- Athanasius II (or III) Dabbas (1611–1619)
- Ignatius III Atiyah (1619–1634)
  - Cyril IV Dabbas (1619–1627)
- Euthymius II (or III) Karmah (1634–1635)
- Euthymius III (or IV) of Chios (1635–1647)
- Macarius III Ibn al-Za'im (1647–1672)
- Neophytos of Chios (1673–1682)
- Athanasius III (or IV) Dabbas (1685–1694), first time
- Cyril V (or III) Zaim (1672–1694, 1694–1720)
- Athanasius III Dabbas (1720–1724), second time

The Greek Orthodox Patriarchate of Antioch split into two factions in 1724 as the Melkite Greek Catholic Church broke communion with the Orthodox Church and established communion with the Catholic Church. Both groups recognize the same list of patriarchs for the period before 1724, but have had different patriarchs since.

== Greek Orthodox patriarchs of Antioch after 1724 ==
- Sylvester (Dabbas) (1724–1766) (appointed by Ecumenical Patriarchate of Constantinople)
- Philemon (1766–1767)
- Daniel (1767–1791)
- Anthemius (1791–1813)
- Seraphim (1813–1823)
- Methodius (1823–1850)
- Hierotheos (1850–1885)
- Gerasimos (1885–1891)
- Spyridon (1891–1898)
- Meletius II (Doumani) (1899–1906)
- Gregory IV (Haddad) (1906–1928)
  - vacant (1928–1931)
- Alexander III (Tahhan) (1931–1958)
  - Arsenius II (Haddad) (1931–1933) (schism)
- Theodosius VI (Abou Rjaileh) (1958–1970)
- Elias IV (Mouawwad) (1970–1979)
- Ignatius IV (Hazim) (1979–2012)
- John X (Yazigi) (2012–present)

== Literature ==
- Ostrogorsky, George (1956). History of the Byzantine State. Oxford: Basil Blackwell.
- Meyendorff, John (1989). Imperial unity and Christian divisions: The Church 450-680 A.D. The Church in history. Vol. 2. Crestwood, NY: St. Vladimir's Seminary Press. ISBN 978-0-88-141056-3.
- Hage, Wolfgang (2007). Das orientalische Christentum. Stuttgart: Kohlhammer Verlag. ISBN 9783170176683.
- Kiminas, Demetrius (2009). The Ecumenical Patriarchate: A History of Its Metropolitanates with Annotated Hierarch Catalogs. Wildside Press LLC. ISBN 9781434458766.
- Prosopographie der mittelbyzantinischen Zeit
- Grumel, Venance (1934). "Le patriarcat et les patriarches d'Antioche sous la seconde domination byzantine (969-1084)". Échos d'Orient. 33 (174): 129–147. doi:10.3406/rebyz.1934.2786.
