= Patriarch Dorotheus =

Patriarch Dorotheus may refer to:

- Dorotheus of Bulgaria, Patriarch of Bulgaria in 1300–c. 1315
- Four Greek Orthodox Patriarchs of Antioch, see the list of Greek Orthodox Patriarchs of Antioch
- Dorotheus V Ibn Al-Ahmar, Melkite Patriarch of Antioch from 1604 to 1611
