= Agios Nikolaos Church =

Coordinates: 36°59′23″N 35°19′22″E

- Agios Nikolaos Greek Orthodox Church
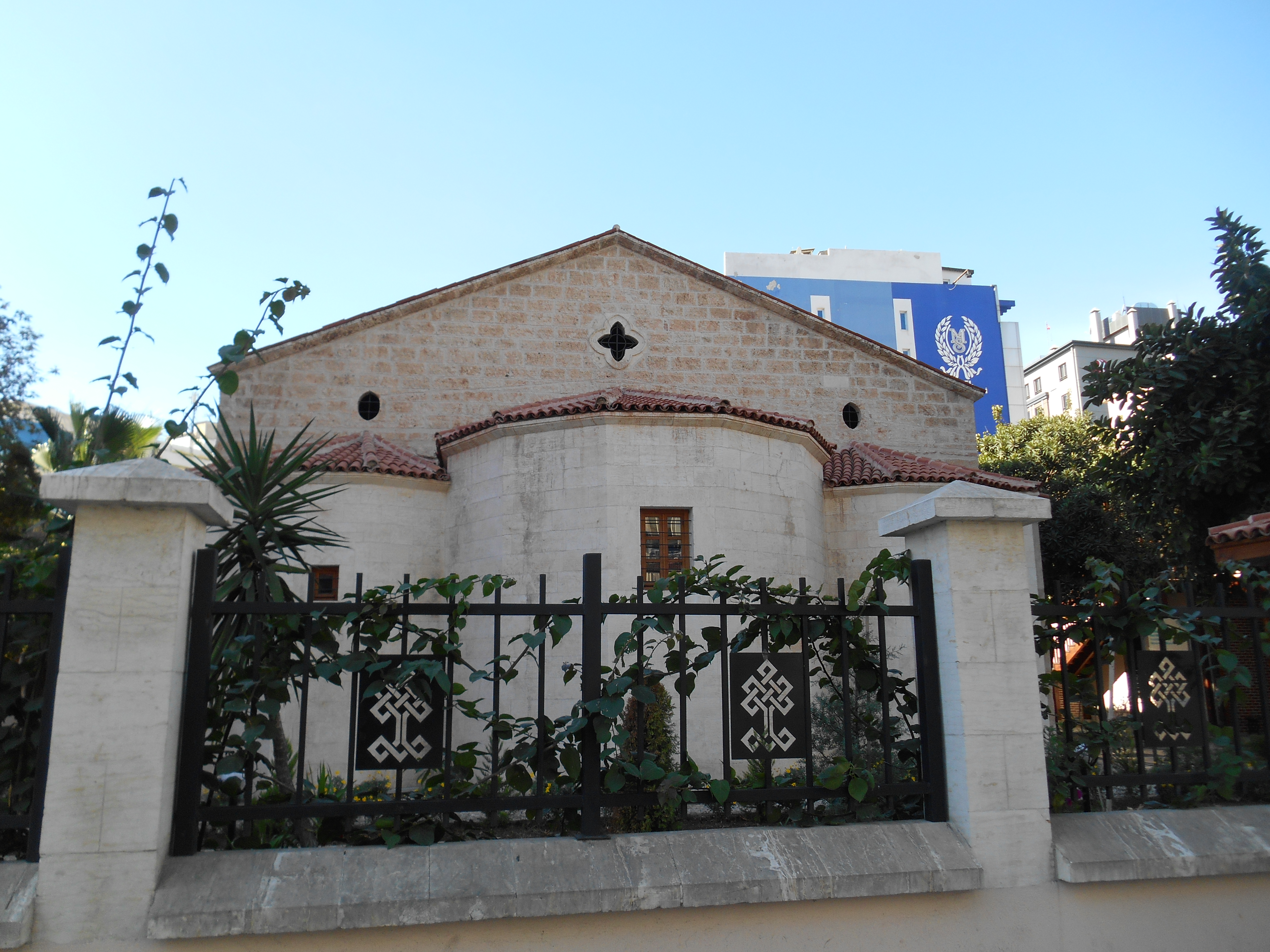
- Street view
- Agios Nikolaos Church
- Location: Ziyapaşa Bulvarı No:114, Seyhan, Adana
- Country: Turkey
- Denomination: Greek Orthodox

History
- Former name: Agios Nikolaos Greek Orthodox Church

Architecture
- Architect: Spür
- Style: Three-domed Basilica
- Completed: 1845

Agios Nikolaos Church (Turkish: Aya Nikola Kilisesi), is the former Greek Orthodox Church located in the Kuruköprü area of the city of Adana. The church temporarily hosts the Provincial Public Library until library's return to its original location.

Agios Nikolaos Greek Orthodox Church was built in 1845 by the Greek community of the city. Church was built according to three-domed basilica plan just like the other Greek churches in Anatolia. From exterior, the structure has a rectangular shape in east-west direction and from interior it has a three-domed basilica plan. The entrance to the church property is from a rectangular gate on the southwest. The symbol of sun on the triangle-shaped fronton on top of the gate, defines 'Entrance to Enlightenment'.

The nine lined Greek inscription on the marble plate above the church door at the westside, dictates :

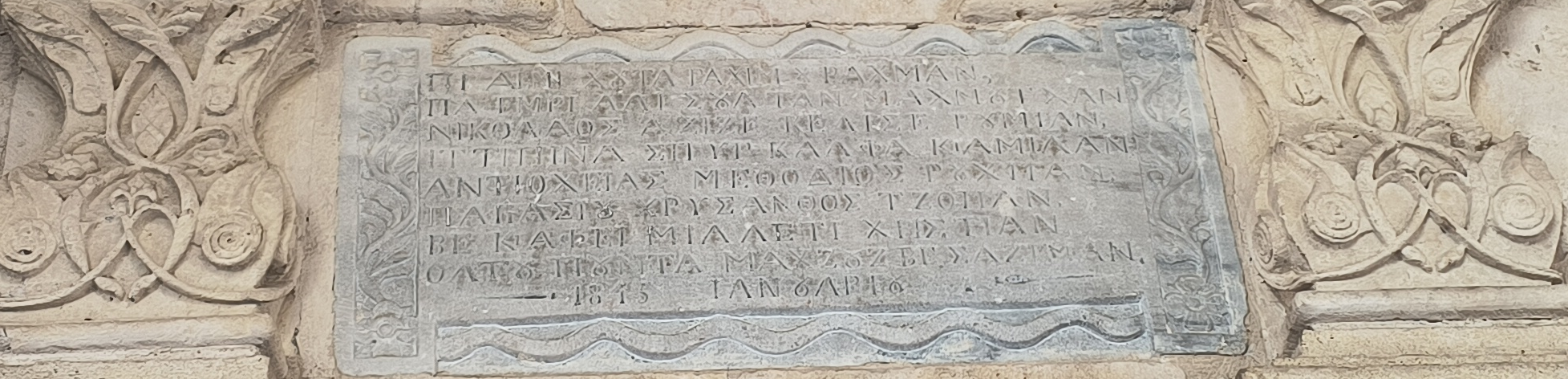
Church inscription in Greek alphabet

Bi abni huda rahim u rahman
Ba emri ali sultan Mahmut Han
Nikolas azize kelise rumiyan
İtti bina Spür kalfa kamilan
Antiokheias Methodios ruhban
Papazı u khyrsanthos çoban
Ukaffei milleti Hristiyan
Oldu bunda mahsus u şamizan
1845 Ocak 1

In English:

With the help of God the merciful, the beneficient and by the order of the supreme Sultan Mahmut Khan, Saint Nicholas church is built by the master-builder Spür from top to toe. Methodius of Antioch, Khrysantos the shepherd and the whole Christian community felt special and emotional with it.
1 January 1845

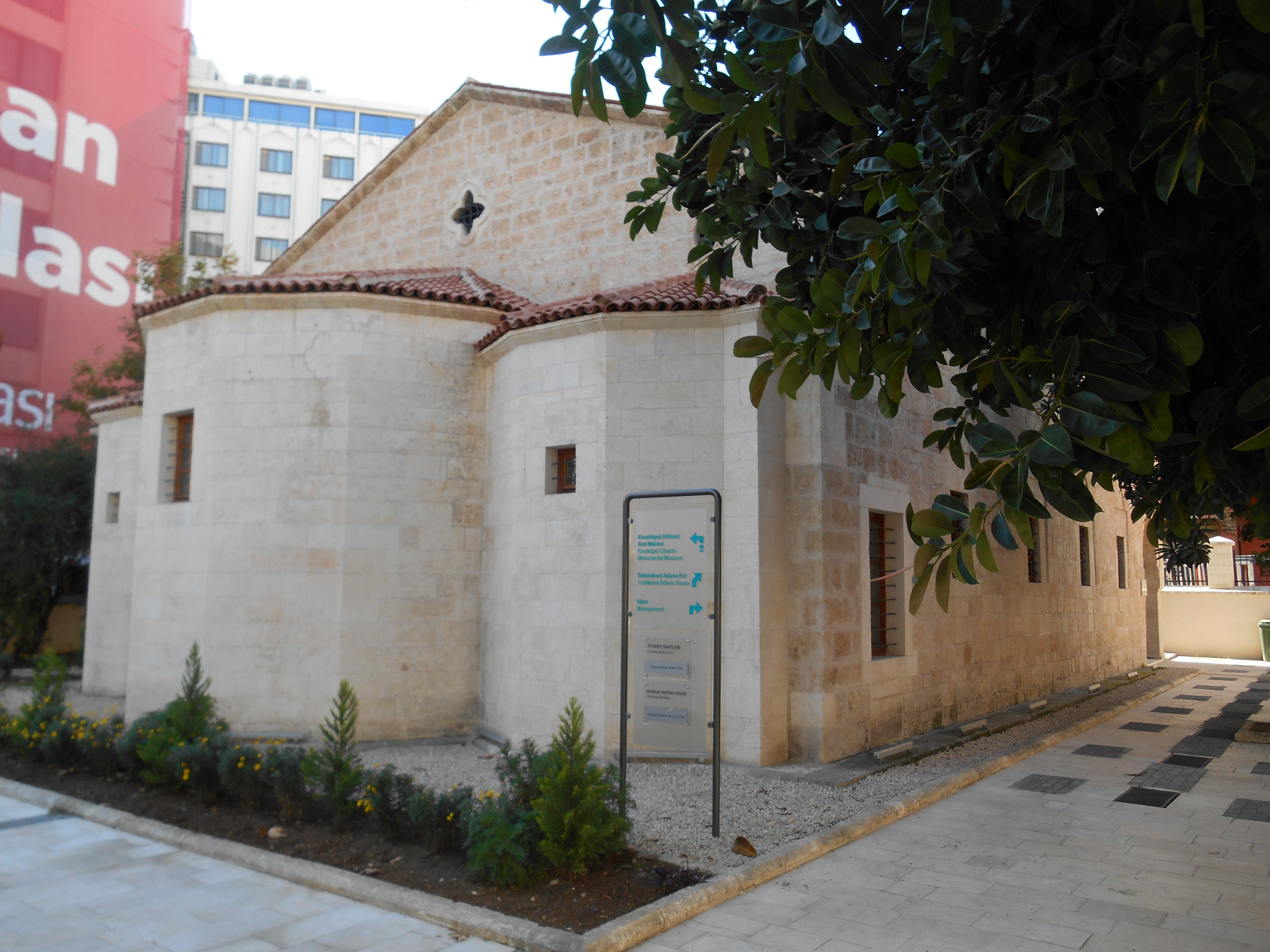
Northeast view

Agios Nikolaos Church was in service until the Greek genocide in 1921 and was abandoned after the departure of the community during the Cilicia Christian evacuation.

The church was converted into Archaeology Museum in 1950. Archaeology Museum moved to a new location in 1972. In 1983, the church was occupied by the newly formed Ethnography Museum. Later, it was used as a museum depot, and in 2015 the church became the Kuruköprü Church Memorial Museum. Provincial Public Library temporarily moved into the building in 2023. The library will return to its original location after the earthquake damage is fully renovated.

== See also ==
- Christianity in Turkey
