= Patriarch Euthymius II =

Patriarch Euthymius II may refer to:

- Euthymius II of Constantinople, Ecumenical Patriarch in 1410–1416
- Euthymius II Karmah, Melkite Patriarch of Antioch in 1634–1635
