= Seraphim of Antioch =

- Occupation: Clergyman

Seraphim was Greek Orthodox Patriarch of Antioch (1813–1823).

== Literature ==
- Hage, Wolfgang (2007). Das orientalische Christentum. Stuttgart: Kohlhammer Verlag. ISBN 9783170176683.

Preceded by Euthymius V of Antioch	Eastern Orthodox Patriarch of Antioch; 1813–1823	Succeeded by Methodius of Antioch
