= Patriarch Theodore =

Patriarch Theodore may refer to:

- Patriarch Theodore I of Alexandria, Greek Patriarch of Alexandria in 607–609
- Theodore (Syriac Orthodox patriarch of Antioch), patriarch between 664 and 667
- Theodore I of Constantinople, Ecumenical Patriarch in 677–679
- Patriarch Theodore II of Alexandria (coadjutor), Greek Patriarch of Alexandria between the 7th and 8th centuries
- Theodore Balsamon, Theodore IV of Antioch (1185–1199), Greek Orthodox patriarch
- Theodore II of Constantinople, Ecumenical Patriarch in 1214–1216
- Patriarch Theodore II of Alexandria, Greek Patriarch of Alexandria since 2004

== See also ==
- Theodore of Antioch (disambiguation)
