= Philemon (given name) =

Given name list

Philemon is a given name. In the Bible, the Epistle to Philemon is addressed to Saint Philemon. Notable people with the given name include:

- Philemon (poet) (ca. 362 BC–ca. 262 BC), Athenian poet and playwright of the New Comedy
- Philemon the actor (died 305), a saint who was converted by Saint Appolonius; they were martyred together
- Philemon of Antioch, Greek Orthodox Patriarch from 1766 to 1767; see List of Greek Orthodox Patriarchs of Antioch
- Philemon Beecher (1776–1839), American attorney and member of the US House of Representatives from Ohio
- Philemon Bliss (1813–1889), member of the US House of Representatives from Ohio Congressman, first chief justice of the Supreme Court of Dakota Territory, and a Missouri Supreme Court justice
- Philemon Dickerson (1788–1862), member of the US House of Representatives, Governor of New Jersey and federal judge
- Philemon Holland (1552–1637), English schoolmaster, physician, and translator
- Phil Masinga (1969–2019), full name Philemon Masinga, South African former footballer who played for teams in several countries
- Philemon Pownoll (ca. 1734–1780), Royal Navy officer
- Philemon Simpson (1819–1895), American politician and lawyer
- Philemon Thomas (1763–1847), member of the US House of Representatives from Louisiana
- Philemon Wright (1760–1839), farmer and entrepreneur in what is now Canada
- Philémon Yang (born 1947), Prime Minister of Cameroon from 2009 to 2019
