= Euthymius V of Antioch =

Anthemius of Antioch
- Occupation: Clergyman

Euthymius or Anthemius was Greek Orthodox Patriarch of Antioch from 1792 to 1813.

== Literature ==
- Hage, Wolfgang (2007). Das orientalische Christentum. Stuttgart: Kohlhammer Verlag. ISBN 9783170176683.

Preceded by Daniel of Antioch	Anthemius; 1792–1813	Succeeded by Seraphim of Antioch
