= Meletius II of Antioch =

Patriarch of Antioch from 1899 to 1906

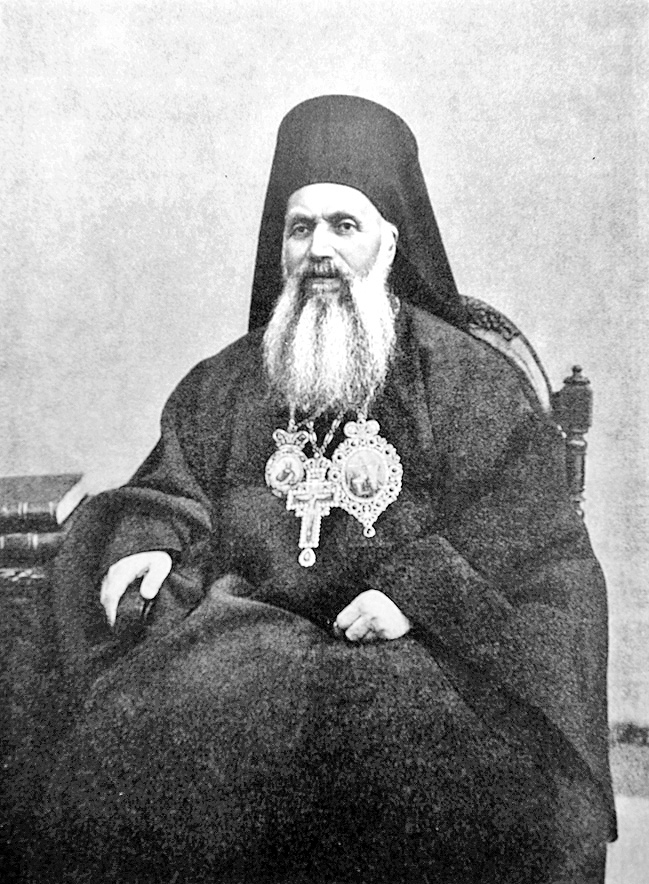

Patriarch Meletius II (AL) Doumani (Arabic: البطريرك ملاتيوس الثاني دوماني al-Baṭriyark Milātiyūs aṯ-Ṯānī Dūmānī (1837 - 1906), was Patriarch of Antioch from 1899 to 1906.

== Early life Meletius Doumani ==
At the time of the Ottoman Empire, Meletius Doumani was born on 8 November, 1837, in the Old City of Damascus, Syria, the district of Joura in the old Bab Touma. (located to the right of the ancient gate, in the neighbourhood of "Da'it in Jourouh")

This was a district, in which the majority of inhabitants were Orthodox Christians of the Church of Antioch. For the most part, they were affluent, and among them lived a Shiite Muslim minority. Generally, they lived together in love, harmony, and mutual respect. It was the case that his family was somewhat wealthy.

Meletius family was like many families of that time, adhering to the true Orthodox Christian Faith, practicing its way of worship in the Levantine manner, in one the 3 temples available there. These temples were; the Mariamite Patriarchal Cathedral, Saint Nicholas, and Saints Cyprian and Justina. Thus, from the very earliest age, he inherited through his family the normal characteristics of piety.

Meletius also acquired the practice of the life of an Orthodox Christian family, including, prayer, worship, and fasting.

Meletius II (as he became) was elected by the members of the Antiochian Holy Synod in 1898, with the exception of 3 Greek bishops who refused to elect him. These 3 Greek bishops soon resigned from their dioceses (Aleppo, Erzurum, Cilicia), and they departed from the Church of Antioch in protest. The protest was joined by Patriarch Sophronius IV of Alexandria and Patriarch Damian of Jerusalem. As a consequence of the influence of Patriarch Constantine V (Valiadis) of Constantinople, who also protested, the Ottoman Sultan did not issue the usual decree of recognition.

This came only a year later, after the great efforts exerted by Kemal Bak al-Qazh, the Undersecretary of the Antiochian Chair in Constantinople (Istanbul). Thus, the manifest will of the Patriarchate of Antioch was accomplished. He was the first Arab and the first Syrian primate of non-Greek descent, in over 170 years.

(Authored by Charles M. A Doumani) ©

== Literature ==
- Mufarrij, Rafeek, «The patriarchal crisis in the See of Antioch and the election of Melatios Doumani: causes, main events and results, 1891—1899» (2000)
- Якушев М. И. Первый Патриарх-араб на Антиохийском престоле // Восточный архив, 2006. - № 14-15. - С. 99-106
- Hage, Wolfgang (2007). Das orientalische Christentum. Stuttgart: Kohlhammer Verlag. ISBN 9783170176683.

Preceded by Spyridon of Antioch	Eastern Orthodox Patriarch of Antioch; 1899–1906	Succeeded by Gregory IV of Antioch
