= Hierotheos of Antioch =

Greek Orthodox Patriarch of Antioch

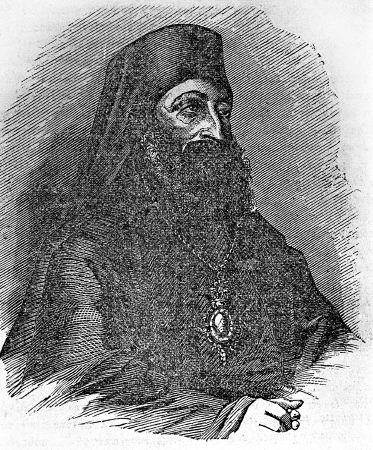
- Born: 1800
- Died: March 28, 1885 (aged 84–85)
- Occupation: Clergyman

Hierotheos (1800 – March 28, 1885) was Greek Orthodox Patriarch of Antioch (October 21, 1850 – March 28, 1885).

== Literature ==
- Hage, Wolfgang (2007). Das orientalische Christentum. Stuttgart: Kohlhammer Verlag. ISBN 9783170176683.

Preceded by Methodius of Antioch	Eastern Orthodox Patriarch of Antioch; 1850–1885	Succeeded by Gerasimus I of Jerasulem
