= Euthymius II =

Euthymius II may refer to:

- Euthymius II of Constantinople (died 1416), Patriarch of Constantinople in 1410–16
- Euthymius II of Novgorod (died 1458), Archbishop of Novgorod in 1429–58
- Euthymius II Karmah (1572–1635), Melkite Patriarch of Antioch in 1634–35
