= Theodore of Antioch =

Theodore of Antioch may refer to:

- Theodore of Mopsuestia (c. 350 – c. 428)
- Theodore (Syriac Orthodox patriarch of Antioch) (649–667)
- Theodore I of Antioch (750–773), Greek Orthodox patriarch
- Theodore II of Antioch (970–976), Greek Orthodox patriarch
- Theodore III of Antioch (1034–1042), Greek Orthodox patriarch
- Theodore Balsamon, Theodore IV of Antioch (1185–1199), Greek Orthodox patriarch
- Theodore of Antioch (philosopher), Syrian philosopher, doctor and translator at the court of Frederick II of Sicily
