= Cyril IV =

Cyril IV may refer to:

- Pope Cyril IV of Alexandria
- Patriarch Cyril IV of Constantinople
- Cyril IV Dabbas, Greek Orthodox Patriarch of Antioch (1619–1627)
