= Patriarch Athanasius II =

Patriarch Athanasius II may refer to:

- Athanasius II of Alexandria, Patriarch of Alexandria in 490–496
- Athanasius II, Patriarch of Antioch (ruled in 683–686)
- Athanasius II of Constantinople, Ecumenical Patriarch in 1450–1453
- Athanasius II Dabbas, Melkite Greek Patriarch of Antioch in 1611–1619
