= Daniel of Antioch =

- Occupation: Clergyman

Daniel was Greek Orthodox Patriarch of Antioch (1767–1791).

== Literature ==
- Hage, Wolfgang (2007). Das orientalische Christentum. Stuttgart: Kohlhammer Verlag. ISBN 9783170176683.

Preceded by Philemon of Antioch	Eastern Orthodox Patriarch of Antioch; 1767–1791	Succeeded by Euthymius V of Antioch
