= Spyridon of Antioch =

Cypriot Orthodox Christian clergyman

- Occupation: Clergyman

Patriarch Spyridon (secular name Anastasios Efthimiou, Greek: Αναστάσιος Ευθυμίου) was Greek Orthodox Patriarch of Antioch (1891–1898).

== Literature ==
- Hage, Wolfgang (2007). Das orientalische Christentum. Stuttgart: Kohlhammer Verlag. ISBN 9783170176683.
- Якушев М. И. Первый Патриарх-араб на Антиохийском престоле // Восточный архив, 2006. — No. 14-15. — С. 99-106

Preceded by Gerasimus I of Jerasulem	Eastern Orthodox Patriarch of Antioch; 1891–1898	Succeeded by Meletius II of Antioch
