= Theodosius III (disambiguation) =

Theodosius III was the Byzantine emperor from 715 to 717.

Theodosius III or Theodosios III may also refer to:

- Theodosius III of Abkhazia, King of the Abkhazians from circa 975 to 978
- Theodosius III of Antioch, Patriarch of Antioch during the mid-11th century
- Pope Theodosius III of Alexandria, Coptic pope between 1294 and 1300
