= Adana Ethnography Museum =

Museum in Turkey

- Adana Ethnography Müzesi
- Location within Turkey
- Established: 1983
- Location: Ziyapaşa Bulvarı No:114, Adana, Turkey
- Coordinates: 36.989444°N 35.323056°E
- Type: Ethnography
- Area: 588,000 sq ft (54,600 m^{2}) in 94 Galleries

Adana Ethnography Museum (Turkish: Adana Etnografya Müzesi), exhibits the ethnographic works, the inscriptions of Adana's landmarks and epitaph and gravestones of Adana's leading figures. The museum was opened in 1983 at the former Greek Church after Archeological Museum moved to its new location. As of May 2012, the museum was closed as it would move to the newly built Museum Complex in 2016. In April 2019 it had not yet been realised.

== The museum ==
=== Stone Works ===
At the garden, inscriptions and tomb stones in kufi, sülüs and nezih calligraphy are exhibited. In the southern and northern sections, female and male tomb stones in the Ottoman tradition from the 17th century are displayed including plain, coin headed, mecidiye type stones as well as stones with crowns shaped as fez, turban or in the baroque style. Tomb stones of some prominent people such as the Governor of Adana, Süleyman Paşazade Ahmet Pasha, the Local Administrator of Karaisali, Hasan Fevzi Bey, The Military Governor of Adana, Miratizade İbrahim Bey, the Treasurer of Adana, Mustafa Bey of Sophia, the Chief Forest Inspector Akif Efendi can be found among the collection.

In the western section, inscriptions from the Turkish-Islamic works are exhibited. The most prominent examples among them are the restoration inscriptions of Misis Inn, Adana Governor's Bureau, Bahripaşa Fountain, Taşköprü, Misis Bridge and the Ottoman State Seal.

=== Ethnographical Works ===
The ethnographical works that are exhibited in different cases are;

1. Rough leather foot-wear, holy water (zemzem) set, copper coffee urn, wooden coffee grinders, brazier, bride's clogs, hedik, hand protection (kirkit), bellows, kirkit, sacks, sun measure
2. Instruments - Ney, reed pipe (kaval), tribal zurnas
3. Gold earrings, necklaces and bracelets
4. Silver belts and belt buckles
5. Necklaces and worry beads with silver charms
6. Silver anklet, ring, head piece (tepelik) and bracelet, cigarette holder, kohl box, and watch with chain
7. Bowed musical instruments (kabak kemane, tambur, kemençe)
8. Sword and shield
9. Short jacket with split sleeves (cepken) woman's garment with gilt embroidery, gilt weaved women's garment displayed on a mannequin
10. Garments - two bindallı and cepken displayed on mannequins

=== Weaving (Istar) Section ===
Hand looms, and weaving instruments and tools (loom, shuttle, kirkit, bowspinning wheel, ılkıdır, kirmen, çıkrık) and kilim samples on the wall.

=== Nomad (Yörük) Tent ===
The tent is a black horsehair tent. Inside the tent, there are trousseau bags, felts and kilims on the floor, wall pillows, a lamp, a partridge cage, a hızman, a gun and a gunpowder case. In front of the tent a leather foot-wear (çarık), a wooden water cup, a stone mortar, a churn, and a spoon case. On the left side of the tent a nomad girl with a butter churn, a hand grinder and on the wall a kilim with a ram horn motif.

=== Oriental Room ===
In the centre there is a brazier and a fully costumed nomad girl mannequin. On the wall there is a deer skin and a copper tray with inscriptions.

- Cases no.1-2-3 : Gilded and lithographic Korans, and samples of "güz"
- Case no.4 : Sword, and knife samples
- Case no 5: Gunpowder-filled guns and gunpowder cases
- Case no.6: Flintlock guns
- Wall case no.7 : Sword and shield
- Case no.8 : Hand towels and money pouches with silver gilt thread embroidery
- Case no 9 : Commonly used garments of the nomadic tribe women

=== Panels ===
Samples of hand woven material from the nomadic tribes living in the Taurus mountains including kilims of various styles such as cicim, zili, sumak or soumak, ilikli and plain weaves, rug, saddle bag, prayer rugs and pillows. There are also felt prayer rugs and trousseau bags.
