= Peter III of Antioch =

Patriarch of Antioch from 1052 to 1057

Patriarch Peter III
- Bishop of Antioch
- Church: Greek Orthodox Church
- See: Antioch
- Installed: spring 1052
- Term ended: after August 1057
- Predecessor: Basil II
- Successor: John IV

Personal details
- Residence: Antioch, Constantinople

Peter III (spring 1052 – after August 1056) was a Patriarch of Antioch in the mid-11th century. He was born in Antioch and educated in Constantinople, where he rose to high office in the church of the Hagia Sophia. He was appointed as Patriarch of Antioch by Emperor Constantine Monomachos in 1052, and served in this role until his death in late 1057.

== Conflict with Constantinople ==
Despite having been educated in Constantinople, Peter defended the rights and dignity of the Patriarchate of Antioch against the encroachments of the Patriarchate of Constantinople. He asserted that the patriarchal title originally belonged solely to the Bishop of Antioch and was only later communicated to others. This stance brought him into direct conflict with Patriarch Michael I Cerularius of Constantinople, who considered himself the head of all Eastern Churches.

The conflict came to a head when an Antiochene deacon named Christodoulos (surnamed Hagiostephanites) was sent to Constantinople by Peter. Michael Cerularius appointed him Kouboukleisios and returned him to Antioch with this new dignity. Enraged by this violation of his church's rights, Peter expelled the deacon, tore up the diploma conferred by his Constantinopolitan colleague, and sent a stern letter of remonstrance to Cerularius. In this letter, Peter reminded Cerularius that the Apostolic Throne of Antioch was not subordinate to that of Constantinople, and that Constantinople's claim to such authority was illegitimate, stemming only from Patriarch John III's previous cession of Antioch's rights.

Michael Cerularius subsequently apologized, shifting the blame to his chartophylax, who had allegedly issued the diploma without his knowledge. Following this apology, Peter restored the deacon to favor, resolving the incident. This episode highlighted Cerularius's tendency to position himself as the protector of other patriarchs, while also showing his willingness to retreat when faced with determined resistance. Despite Peter's energetic protests, the practice of the Patriarch of Antioch being ordained by the Bishop of Constantinople—a situation established since John III—continued during Peter's tenure. It likely persisted for his successors until the Latin conquest, as they derived their election from the emperor and followed established custom.

== Disciplinary independence ==
Peter also demonstrated independence in matters of church discipline. During a period when the fast of the Assumption had largely disappeared from the liturgy in the 10th, 11th, and 12th centuries, Peter was the first patriarch to affirm the legitimacy of this practice. Having been raised in Antioch, where the fast had likely never ceased, he was struck by its neglect during his long stay in Constantinople and sought to react against the capital's example by maintaining the ancient usage once he became patriarch.

== Relations with Georgia ==
Theodore Balsamon records a synodal act attributed to a synod convened by Peter. This act declared the Church of Iberia, previously subject to Antioch, to be free and autocephalous. However, this act lacks historical context explaining its reasons, causing some scholars to suggest the event may actually belong to the patriarchate of Theodosius III rather than Peter.

== Rediscovered work ==
Peter corresponded with Christian leaders of the time, including Pope Leo IX and Patriarch Michael Keroularious. A previously unknown letter from Peter to the clergy of Antioch was found in the codex Vatopedi 574 in the early 20th century. It was written from Constantinople to announce his election.
