= Philemon =

Philemon may refer to:

== In the Bible ==
- Epistle to Philemon, a book in the New Testament
- Philemon (biblical figure), recipient of Paul's Epistle to Philemon

== Arts and entertainment ==
- Philémon (comics), a Franco-Belgian comic book series by Fred
- Philemon (musical), a 1975 off-Broadway musical by Tom Jones and Harvey Schmidt
- Philemon Arthur and the Dung, a music group from Scania, Sweden, consisting of two members, whose real names are unknown
- Philemon, a character from the Persona video game series
- Baucis and Philemon, the couple from the Metamorphoses of Greek mythology
- Philemon, a wise spirit guide in The Red Book, by Carl Jung

== People ==
- Helen Philemon (born 1980), track and field athlete from Papua New Guinea
- Philemon (given name), a list of people with the given name
- Philemon (poet), an Athenian poet and playwright of the New Comedy
- Philemon (geographer), an Ancient Greek geographer of the 1st century AD

== Other ==
- Philemon Foundation, a non-profit organization for publication of the complete works of Carl Gustav Jung
- Philemon Ministries, a Kenyan prison ministry charity founded by Kelvin Mwikya
- Philemon (bird), a genus of birds in the family Meliphagidae

== See also ==
- Filemón Pi, a Spanish comic book character
- The Adventures of Filemon the Cat (The Adventures of Filemon the Cat), the title character in a Polish animated cartoon
