= Nicephorus of Antioch =

Patriarch of Antioch in the late 11th century

Patriarch Nikephoros the Black
- Bishop of Antioch
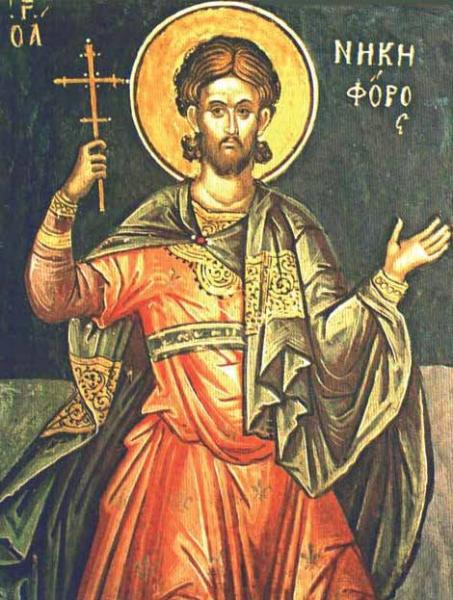
- Native name: Νικηφόρος Μαύρος
- Church: Greek Orthodox Church
- See: Antioch
- Installed: by 1079/80
- Term ended: before 1089
- Predecessor: Aemilian
- Successor: John V

Personal details
- Residence: Antioch

Nikephoros Mavros (Ancient Greek: Νικηφόρος Μαύρος, "Nikephoros the Black"; fl. 1079/1080) was the Patriarch of Antioch in the late 11th century. He is recorded as the immediate successor of Aemilian, though almost no other details regarding his life, background, or the exact duration of his tenure are known.

== Patriarchate ==
Nikephoros assumed the patriarchal throne of Antioch around 1079 or 1080, following the death of Aemilian. The precise date of his death or the end of his patriarchate remains entirely unknown.

Despite the scarcity of information, the historian Venance Grumel inferred that Nikephoros successfully navigated the turbulent political transition of the early 1080s. He likely survived the deposition and fall of Emperor Nikephoros III Botaneiates in 1081 and managed to maintain favorable relations with the new ruling dynasty under Emperor Alexios I Komnenos. This political adaptability stands in stark contrast to the fate of his predecessor, Aemilian, whose name was expunged from ecclesiastical records due to his conflicts with the Komnenoi. The fact that Nikephoros' name was formally retained and honored in the acclamations of the Antiochene patriarchal Synodikon (diptychs) is evidence of his ability to secure his political standing.
