= Gerasimus I of Jerusalem =

Greek-orthodox patriarch of Jerusalem

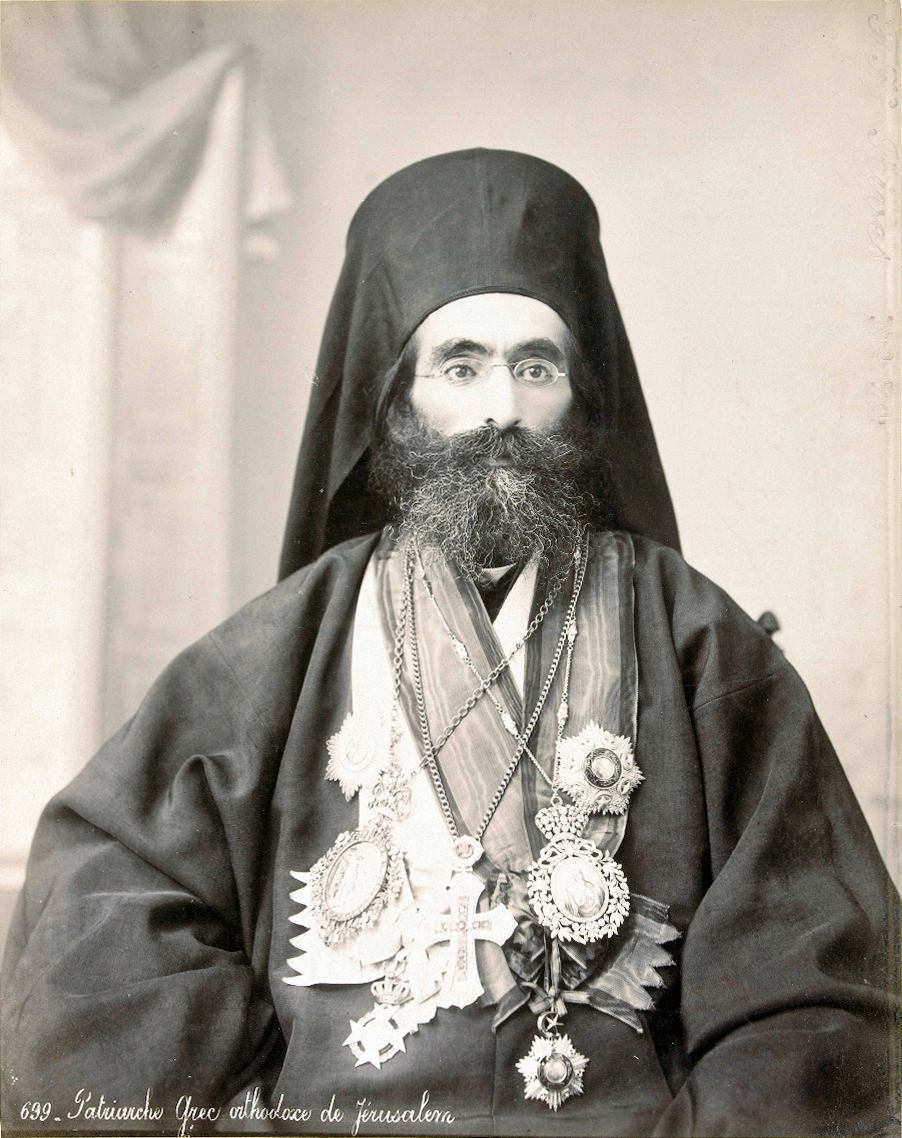
- Greek Patriarch of Jerusalem, in Journey through the Middle East and Egypt by Richard Polack in 1895-1896.
- Born: 1839
- Died: 1897 (aged 57–58)
- Occupation: Clergyman

Gerasimus I (1839-1897) was Greek Orthodox Patriarch of Antioch (1886-1891) and Greek Orthodox Patriarch of Jerusalem from March 11, 1891, to February 21, 1897. It was during his administration as Patriarch of Jerusalem that the full significance of the mosaic map found on the church floor in Madaba was understood. In 1885, Gerasimus was the Bishop of Scythopolis, a city just south of the Sea of Galilee. He was occupied with defending the Orthodox faithful in the towns of Husn and Karak from missionaries when, on June 19, 1885, he learned that he had been elected to the see of Antioch. On January 27, 1890, the patriarch of Jerusalem, Nikodemus, resigned and Patriarch Gerasimus was elected his successor as Patriarch of Jerusalem.

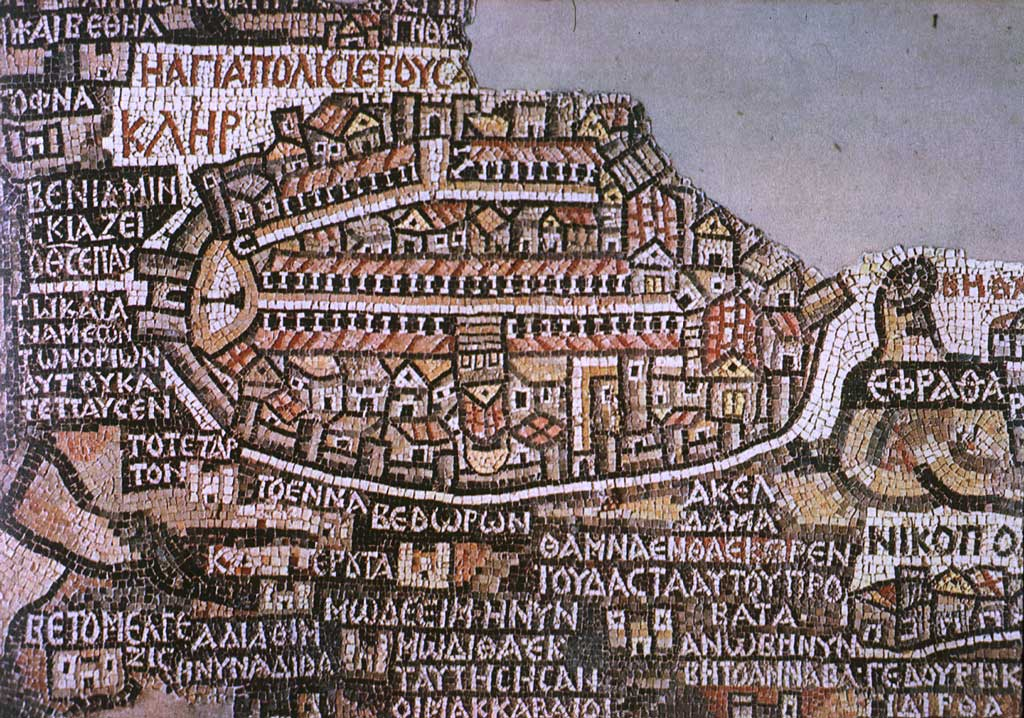
Madaba

At the time he came to lead the Patriarchate of Jerusalem, efforts were underway to restore a church in the community of Madaba in which was found a mosaic map on the floor of an ancient church, now the Church of St. George. Realizing the importance of this discovery, Patriarch Gerasimus took action to have the archaeological find properly investigated and preserved. Gerasimus was also confronted with the activities of the Russian Orthodox Palestinian Society in Palestine that had been ignoring the historical presence of the Patriarchate of Jerusalem. Their actions led him to increase construction of schools to neutralize the efforts of the Russian society.

== See also ==
- Gerasimus of the Jordan, 5th century saint
- Gerasimus I of Constantinople, 14th century Patriarch
- Gerasimus of Kefalonia, patron saint of Kefalonia, Greece

== Literature ==
- Hage, Wolfgang (2007). Das orientalische Christentum. Stuttgart: Kohlhammer Verlag. ISBN 9783170176683.

Preceded by Hierotheos	Eastern Orthodox Patriarch of Antioch; 1885–1891	Succeeded by Spyridon
Preceded by Nicodemus I	Eastern Orthodox Patriarch of Jerusalem; 1891–1897	Succeeded by Damian I
