= Elias II of Antioch =

11th-century Patriarch of Antioch

Patriarch Elias II
- Bishop of Antioch
- Native name: Ἠλίας
- Church: Greek Orthodox Church
- See: Antioch
- Installed: April 1, 1032
- Term ended: September 8, 1033
- Predecessor: Nicholas II
- Successor: Theodore III
- Previous post: Monk in an unnamed monastery in Nicomedia

Personal details
- Died: September 8, 1033
- Residence: Nicomedia, Antioch

Elias II Sophronites (Ancient Greek: Ἠλίας Βʹ ὁ σοφρονιτής; died September 8, 1033) was the Greek Orthodox Patriarch of Antioch from April 1, 1032 until his death.

== Early life ==
Prior to his elevation to the patriarchate, Elias was a monk at a monastery in the city of Nicomedia. The epithet "Sophronites" (ὁ σοφρονιτής) is specifically attested in a manuscript from Jerusalem.

== Patriarchate ==
Elias was consecrated as Patriarch of Antioch in Constantinople on April 1, 1032. His tenure lasted for one year, five months, and eight days.

He left virtually no historical trace other than his signature on the tomos of Alexios Stoudites against the Monophysites. This signature was likely affixed shortly after his election and prior to his departure for Antioch. The tomos in question is apparently the one from May 1030, which was confirmed in a new synod convened on the occasion of Elias's election.

Elias's participation in this synod, combined with the chronological data provided by the Arab Christian historian Yahya of Antioch, allows for a more precise dating of the event than previously assigned by scholar Gerhard Ficker, who had broadly placed it between 1030 and 1038. This precise dating has significant implications for the chronology of the numerous signatories of the tomos.

== Death ==
Elias II died on September 8, 1033.
