= Joachim V =

Greek Orthodox Patriarch of Antioch

Joachim V Daw
- Patriarch of Antioch
- Church: Greek Orthodox Church of Antioch
- See: Patriarch of Antioch
- Installed: 1581
- Term ended: 1592
- Predecessor: Michael VI (Sabbagh)
- Successor: Joachim VI

Personal details
- Died: 1592

Patriarch Joachim V (died 1592) was Greek Orthodox Patriarch of Antioch from 1581 to 1592.

== Life ==
Upon the death of Patriarch Joachim IV in 1576, the Orthodox bishops of Syria selected Joachim V (then Metropolitan Dorotheus of Tripoli), Metropolitan Macarius of Euchaita, and Metropolitan Gregorius of Aleppo as the three most worthy candidates to succeed him, and tasked the three with deciding among themselves who should become patriarch. Gregorius, who did not want to abandon his see due to his popularity and political strength in Aleppo, voted for Macarius, and Dorotheus did the same.

Macarius, who took the name Michael upon his enthronement, resigned in 1581 under intense pressure from the Orthodox community of Damascus, where the seat of the patriarchate was located. The Damascenes asked Joachim to become the next patriarch, and he accepted. However, Michael soon retracted his abdication, and the two both claimed to be the rightful patriarch until 1583, when Michael abdicated a second time.

During the feud with Michael, Joachim was forced to spend huge sums of money to buy support from both Church and governmental authorities. In particular, Joachim promised the rulers of Damascus and Tripoli (two very important centers of the patriarchate) large sums of money to support him, but found soon after that he could not afford to pay the promised amounts. In fear for his life, the patriarch briefly went into hiding in the mountains of modern Lebanon before journeying to Constantinople to seek financial aid from the wealthy Greeks of the capital. When such support proved insufficient, Joachim went on an alms-gathering trip to Russia between 1585 and 1587. The trip was successful, and when he returned to Damascus, he paid off his debts and had more than enough left over to solidify his fragile authority over all the Orthodox bishops of Syria. For the remainder of his term as patriarch, his main assistant was Metropolitan Anastasius of Triploli, Beirut, Tyre, and Sidon.
