= John IV of Antioch (Chalcedonian) =

Patriarch of Antioch from 1056 to 1057

Patriarch John IV
- Bishop of Antioch
- Native name: Ἰωάννης
- Church: Greek Orthodox Church
- See: Antioch
- Installed: late 1056
- Term ended: early August 1057
- Predecessor: Peter III
- Successor: Theodosius III

Personal details
- Died: c. early August 1057
- Residence: Antioch

John IV (Ancient Greek: Ἰωάννης Δ΄; died c. early August 1057) was Patriarch of Antioch from late 1056 until his death in 1057. His existence was long unrecognized, since he is absent from the patriarchal Synodikon and from the Arabic list transmitted by Joseph Simon Assemani; he is known instead from the contemporary hagiography "Life of Saint George the Hagiorite".

== Identification and sources ==
John IV was unknown to Michel Le Quien and to most later compilers of patriarchal lists. His existence is attested by an anonymous Georgian hagiographer, a disciple of Saint George Mtatsmindeli, who describes George's defence of the independence of the Church of Iberia against the patriarch of Antioch sometime between 1054 and 1059. Marie-Félix Brosset, reading the name of the patriarch in that episode as John, considered the information so surprising that he refused to accept it. Heinrich Gelzer, by contrast, was willing to admit a patriarch omitted from the Synodica and from Assemani's Arabic list, since those sources are lacunose and their silence cannot outweigh a well-attested contemporary testimony.

The difficulties are partly textual. In the Latin edition of the Life published in the Analecta Bollandiana under the title Vie de S. Georges l'Hagiorite, the episode concerning Iberia is attached to a patriarch named Theodosius, not John. The same text, however, expressly names John as the predecessor of Theodosius, who succeeded him after his death; it also distinguishes John from another patriarch still occupying the throne in the summer of 1056, who can only have been Peter III. At the place where the latter patriarch appears, he already knows George, whereas John hears of him for the first time. John's existence must therefore be recognized and his name inserted in the list of the patriarchs of Antioch, as the Bollandist editor observed.

== Reign ==
John's patriarchate was brief. It cannot have begun before September 1056: Queen Mariam, who was present at Constantinople when the empress Theodora died on 21 August 1056 and then travelled directly to Antioch, still found Peter III, John's predecessor, in possession of the see there. It had ended before 15 August 1057, because on 30 August of that year a new holder of the see, Theodosius III, appears among those at Constantinople who proclaimed Isaac I Komnenos emperor. Allowing at least a fortnight for the news of one patriarch's death to travel and for his successor to be elected, John's death probably fell in the first half of August 1057; Theodosius' presence at Constantinople at Isaac's accession is best explained by his having just been elected.

=== Destruction of the Church of Saint Peter ===
During John's patriarchate the Church of Saint Peter at Antioch was damaged by lightning. The patriarch was deeply distressed, and on this occasion George the Hagiorite visited him and offered consolation. John died shortly afterwards, a sequence which helps to date the disaster. The year given in the chronicle of Matthew of Edessa, even after the correction proposed by the Bollandist editors, remains too late and must be moved back a further year. Both Matthew of Edessa and Michael the Syrian state that the patriarch perished in the fire. The Life of George shows that this was not so: the error arose because the destruction of the church and the patriarch's death followed one another closely, so that with the passage of time they appeared simultaneous and then connected. Syriac Jacobite writers in particular were inclined to interpret the event as a punishment sent by divine vengeance.

== Omission from the Synodikon ==
No certain explanation is known for John's absence from the patriarchal Synodikon. Grumel suggested three possibilities, none of them supported by direct evidence: that the memory of his very short reign was simply lost when the list was compiled or revised at the beginning of the twelfth century; that, following the protests of Peter III against interference by Constantinople, the clergy of Antioch obtained the right to have John ordained by the metropolitans of their own patriarchate, whereupon the Great Church chose to ignore an ordination in which it had not participated; or that John disapproved of the revolt of Isaac Komnenos and was consequently expunged as an enemy of the new dynasty. A similar explanation has been offered for the omission of Emilian, a later successor of John.
