= Methodius of Antioch =

- Born: 1771
- Died: 1850 (aged 78–79)
- Occupation: Clergyman

Methodius (1771–1850) was Greek Orthodox Patriarch of Antioch (May 25, 1823 – July 6, 1850). Little is known of Patriarch Methodius' life. In May 1848, Methodius was a signatory, with the patriarchs of Constantinople, Alexandria, and Jerusalem, of an encyclical to the Church responding to the "Epistle to the Easterns" by Pope Pius IX. The encyclical denounced the Filioque added by Rome to the Nicene-Constantinopolitan Creed as a heresy, censured the papacy for missionizing among Orthodox Christians, and repudiated Ultramontanism (papal supremacy).

== Literature ==
- Hage, Wolfgang (2007). Das orientalische Christentum. Stuttgart: Kohlhammer Verlag. ISBN 9783170176683.

Preceded by Seraphim of Antioch	Eastern Orthodox Patriarch of Antioch; 1823–1850	Succeeded by Hierotheos of Antioch
