= Joachim VI =

Patriarch of Antioch from 1593 to 1604

Joachim VI ibn Ziyada
- Patriarch of Antioch
- Church: Greek Orthodox Church of Antioch
- See: Patriarch of Antioch
- Installed: 1593
- Term ended: 1604
- Predecessor: Joachim V
- Successor: Dorotheus IV (or V) Ibn Al-Ahmar

Patriarch Joachim VI (died 1604) was Greek Orthodox Patriarch of Antioch from 1593 to 1604.

== Life ==
Joachim VI was born in the village of Sisniya, in the Akkar region of modern Lebanon. Before his enthronement as patriarch, he was the Metropolitan of Homs.

Joachim was elected Patriarch of Antioch in 1593, after a one-year vacancy of the see. He is remembered for his weak reign and his inability to control the Orthodox bishops of Syria from governing their sees autonomously. Corruption was rampant in the patriarchate as a result of his weakness, so much so that Pariarch Meletius I of Alexandria wrote a letter to him condemning him.

The real power controlling the patriarchate during his reign was the Orthodox laity of Damascus, led by Sheikh Jirjis ibn Samur. Jirjis's strength grew so great that in 1604 he forced Joachim (who by that point was blind and enfeebled) to abdicate in favor of his preferred candidate for patriarch, 'Abd al-'Aziz ibn al-Ahmar, who took the name Dorotheus.
