= Basil II of Antioch =

11th–century Patriarch of Antioch

Patriarch Basil II
- Bishop of Antioch
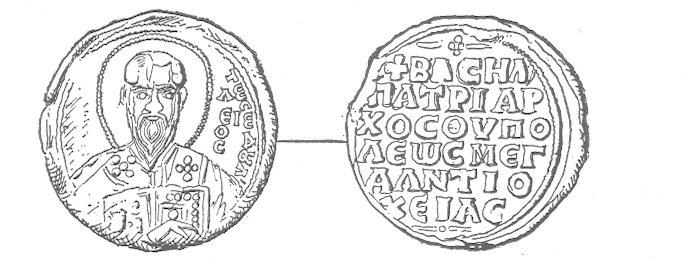
- Seal of Basil II
- Church: Greek Orthodox Church
- Installed: after September 1042
- Term ended: before spring 1052
- Predecessor: Theodore III
- Successor: Peter III

Basil II was a Patriarch of Antioch in the mid-11th century. Venance Grumel, who assembled biographies of the Patriarchs of Antioch in the 10th and 11th century, listed Basil II as the only entry between the death of Theodore Krites in September 1042 and the ascension of Peter III in Spring 1052.

At least one seal of Patriarch Basil has been identified, belonging to the collections of the Archaeological Society of Athens. The French historian Gustave Schlumberger published a sketch of the seal in 1900.
