= John VI of Antioch =

Greek Orthodox patriarch of Antioch from 1106 to after 1134

Patriarch John VI
- Bishop of Antioch
- Native name: Ἰωάννης
- Church: Greek Orthodox Church
- See: Antioch
- Installed: 1106
- Term ended: after 1134
- Predecessor: John V
- Successor: Luke

Personal details
- Born: family name Ἁπλουχέρης
- Residence: Constantinople

John VI (Ancient Greek: Ἰωάννης ΣΤ΄; fl. 1106–1134), also known by his family name Haploucheres (Ancient Greek: Ἁπλουχέρης, also found as Ἁπλοῦχειρ, Haploucheir), was the Orthodox Patriarch of Antioch during the early 12th century. Due to the Crusader occupation of Antioch, he uniquely exercised patriarchal authority while residing in exile in Constantinople.

== Background and name ==
Before his elevation to the patriarchate, John was a member of the clergy of the Great Church of Constantinople. His family name is recorded in synodal acts as Haploucheres (Ἁπλουχέρης), a name that appears in other 12th-century sources in the variant form Haploucheir (Ἁπλοῦχειρ). In later printed editions of the primary sources, such as those by Migne, this name was erroneously transcribed as "ἀπολεχθέντα" (apolechthenta).

== Patriarchate in exile ==
John was elected patriarch in 1106. His election aligns with the geopolitical realities of the time, as formalized in the Treaty of Devol (1108) between Emperor Alexios I Komnenos and the Crusader leader Bohemond. One of the treaty's clauses stipulated that the Patriarch of Antioch must not be a Latin, but rather must be appointed by the Eastern Roman emperor from among the clergy of the Great Church of Constantinople. Since John had already held the office for two years by the time this treaty was signed, his background perfectly matched the imperial requirement.

Throughout his tenure, John remained in Constantinople. Despite his physical absence from Antioch, he continued to exercise the proper acts of his jurisdiction over the portions of his patriarchal territory that remained under or had returned to Roman control. This included the authority to appoint bishops to vacant sees and to personally ordain them. He is attested as still holding the office in 1134, though the exact date of his death or the end of his patriarchate is unknown.

== Later mentions ==
Beyond the synodal records of his appointments, John VI is mentioned in a Semeioma (an imperial decree or record) issued by Alexios I Komnenos in 1117. This document records the formal retraction of the theologian Eustratius of Nicaea, which was made before the emperor, the Ecumenical Patriarch of Constantinople and his synod, the Patriarch of Alexandria Sabbas, the Patriarch of Antioch John, and the elite of the Senate in Constantinople.
