= Philemon of Antioch =

18th century Patriarch of Antioch

- Occupation: Clergyman

Philemon was Greek Orthodox Patriarch of Antioch (1766–1767).

== Literature ==
- Hage, Wolfgang (2007). Das orientalische Christentum. Stuttgart: Kohlhammer Verlag. ISBN 9783170176683.

Preceded by Sylvester of Antioch	Eastern Orthodox Patriarch of Antioch; 1766–1767	Succeeded by Daniel of Antioch
