= Ignatius III Atiyah =

- Patriarch of Antioch
- Church: Melkite Orthodox Church
- See: Patriarch of Antioch
- Installed: 24 April 1619
- Term ended: 1634
- Predecessor: Athanasius II Dabbas
- Successor: Euthymius II Karmah

Personal details
- Born: Kafr Buhum

Patriarch Ignatius III Atiyah (died 1634) was Melkite Patriarch of Antioch from 1619 to 1634. The first years of his patriarchate were marked by the split of the Melkite Church in two factions, a situation that lasted till the Synod of Ras-Baalbek held in 1628 which confirmed Ignatius Atiyah as the only Patriarch and ruled about the independence of the Melkite Orthodox Church.

== Ignatius III Atiyah and Cyril IV Dabbas ==
Ignatius was born in the village of Kafr Buhum near Hama. After the death of Athanasius II Dabbas, the Melkite Church split between two claiming Patriarchs, Ignatius III Atiyah and Cyril IV Dabbas, who both were consecrated on the same day, April 24, 1619 but in different places.

Ignatius Atiyah started his career as secretary of the Emir Fakhr-al-Din II and in 1605 he became metropolitan of Saida. The Christian people of Damascus, unhappy with the leadership of Dabbas, chose Ignatius and sent him to be consecrated Patriarch of Antioch in Constantinople, where, on April 24, 1619, the Ecumenical Patriarch Timothy II celebrated the ordination.

Cyril Dabbas was the brother of the previous Patriarch Athanasius Dabbas and he himself metropolitan of Bosra. He was strongly supported by the Greek Orthodox Patriarch of Alexandria, Cyril Lucaris. His consecration as Patriarch was held on April 24, 1619 in Amioun, Lebanon, by the hands of metropolitans Simeon of Hama, Lazaros of Homs and Dionysios of Hosn, under the political influence of the Pasha of Tripoli, Yusuf Sayfa.

The Melkite Church was thus split in two factions: the area of central Syria, including Hama, Homs, Paneas, and politically under the authority of Tripoli, recognized the authority of Cyril Dabbas, while the region of Mount Lebanon, under the Emir Fakhr-al-Din II, as well as the Northern region Aleppo, were faithful to Ignatius Atiyah. This split of the Church not only created discord, but also caused a huge expenditure of money, because both part asked for the formal recognition by the Ottoman sultan who granted it successively to the party who paid more. Atiyah had problems raising finance from Hama and Homs due to the progressively reducing number of parishioners in the region during this period, due to increasing conversion to Sunni Islam among freeholders and artisans since the early 1600s.

Initially the situation was in favor of Cyril Dabbas, because his protector, Cyril Lucaris on November 4, 1620 became Patriarch of Constantinople and succeed to get a firman from the Sultan ordering to deport Ignatius to Cyprus and to punish all bishops who did not recognized Cyrill as the sole Patriarch. In 1624 the situation started to change because of the defeat of the Pasha of Tripoli, the main political protector of Cyril, by the Emir Fakhr-al-Din II. Cyrill had to leave Tripoli and moved to Aleppo, where he immediately clashed with the metropolitan of the town, Meletius Karmah, a fierce opponent of him. Cyril succeeded two times to have Meletius imprisoned, but always Meletius, supported by the Christian population of Aleppo, refused to recognize him.

== Synod of Ras-Baalbek ==
In order to settle the split of the Melkite Church, in 1628 the Emire Fakhr-al-Din II summoned a synod of all the bishops at Ras-Baalbek, a town a few kilometers north of Baalbek, Lebanon, where the Emire lived. The synod was opened on the June 1st, 1628 in the church of the Blessed Virgin and all the twelve Melkite Orthodox bishops were present, a part from Cyril Dabbas, who shortly before the synod tried to renounce to the throne in change to an eparchy. The synod proclaimed Ignatius III Atiyah as the only Patriarch, and Cyril Dabbas he was brought in chains to Ras-Baalbek and exiled near Hermel, where shortly later he was executed by men of the Emir.

The synod issued twenty canons, which can be so summarized:

- canons 1 to 6 deal with the election and consecration of the Patriarch. The synod formally decreed that the patriarch had to be elected by the people, who could define up to three names among which the Patriarch had to be chosen casting lots. The civil confirmation had to be requested only after the decision of the Patriarch. The synod also strictly condemned the external influence of any political party in the process of choosing the Patriarch. It shall be noted that the motivation given to reject the appointment of Cyril Dabbas was that he was not elected by the people of Damascus;
- canon 7 condemns the practice of simony, a use quite common particularly to grant the recognition of appointments by the Ottoman authorities, and it deals on the possible income of the Patriarch while conferring sacraments;
- canons 8 and 19 are about the qualifications to become priest;
- canon 9 deals with illegitimate marriages;
- canons 10 and 12 rule the festivals after baptism and marriage;
- canon 11 deals with issues about the dowry to be given to a girl;
- canon 13 forbids the sacrament of marriage to be conferred outside church buildings;
- canon 15 forbids monasteries where lived both men and women;
- canons 14 and 16 condemn magicians and heretic books;
- canons 17 and 18 condemn priests asking money without proper authorization;
- canon 20 forbids lay patriarchal vicars.

The regulations set forth by this synod were important in confirming the regularity and legitimacy of the election of the pro-Catholic Cyril Tanas in the 1724 events which led to the split of Melkite Church.

== Last years ==
After the 1638 Synod of Ras-Baalbek, Ignatius III Atiyah went on reigning for other six years, and he decided to abide mainly at Beirut, near to his protector the Druze Emir Fakhr-al-Din II. In 1633 the Ottoman Sultan started a successful war against the will of independence of the Emir, and Ignatius Atiyah, now without political protection, had to escape from Beirut to Saida. When he tried to return to Beirut dressed up as a soldier, he was shot by a group of druzes and he died immediately. The exact date it is not known, but it was in the early months of 1634.
