= Michael VI Sabbagh =

Michael VI al-Hamawi
- Patriarch of Antioch
- Church: Greek Orthodox Church of Antioch
- See: Patriarch of Antioch
- Installed: 1576
- Term ended: 1581
- Predecessor: Joachim IV (Ibn Juma)
- Successor: Joachim V

Personal details
- Died: 1592

Patriarch Michael VI (died 1592) was Greek Orthodox Patriarch of Antioch from 1576 to 1581, and antipatriarch of Antioch from 1581 to 1583.

== Life ==
Upon the death of his predecessor Patriarch Joachim IV, the Orthodox bishops of Syria selected Michael (then Metropolitan Macarius of Euchaita), Metropolitan Dorotheus of Tripoli, and Metropolitan Gregorius of Aleppo as the three most worthy candidates to succeed him, and tasked the three with deciding among themselves who should become patriarch. Gregorius, who did not want to abandon his see due to his popularity and political strength in Aleppo, voted for Michael, and Dorotheus did the same.

Michael soon became deeply unpopular with the Orthodox Christians of Damascus, the seat of the patriarchate, and in 1581 they forced him to abdicate, whereafter Metropolitan Dorotheus took the throne with their support as Patriarch Joachim V. Michael retired to Hama, his native city, where Metropolitan Gregorius convinced him to withdraw his abdication in order to challenge the power of the Orthodox community of Damascus. The resulting schism lasted until 1583, with massive sums of money being spent on both sides in attempts to buy support. Michael received the backing of the Ottoman Sultan, but Joachim bribed the ruler of Damascus to ignore the sultan's order and recognize him as patriarch. By 1583, Michael's support had dwindled, and he abdicated a second time, thus ceding the see of Antioch to Joachim.
