= Aemilian of Antioch =

Patriarch of Antioch in the late 11th century

Patriarch Aemilian
- Bishop of Antioch
- Native name: Αἰμιλιανός
- Church: Greek Orthodox Church
- See: Antioch
- Installed: by 1074
- Term ended: 1078 or 1079
- Predecessor: Theodosius III
- Successor: Nicephorus the Black

Personal details
- Died: 1078 or 1079
- Residence: Antioch

Aemilian (Ancient Greek: Αἰμιλιανός; died 1078 or 1079) was Patriarch of Antioch during the late 11th century. He is notable for his deep involvement in the political affairs of both Antioch and Constantinople, including his support for the rebel commander Philaretos Brachamios and his role in the revolt that brought Nikephoros III Botaneiates to power in 1078.

== Patriarchate ==
Although the patriarchal Synodikon of Antioch lists Nikephoros as the immediate successor to Theodosius III, the see was in fact held by Aemilian in the intervening period. He is first attested in 1074 in Antioch itself, where he acted as a partisan of Philaretos Brachamios, who had seized control of the city following the death of the governor Joseph Tarchaneiotes. Given the nature of his political standing and influence, it seems likely that Aemilian must have held the patriarchal office for a considerable time prior to this date.

== Conflict with the Komnenoi and exile ==
Aemilian's political activities eventually drew the ire of the imperial government in Constantinople. Isaac Komnenos, who had been appointed doux of Antioch by the emperor, received orders to arrest the patriarch and send him under heavy guard to the capital. Because of Aemilian's immense popularity among the local populace, Isaac was forced to employ deception to carry out this difficult mandate.

Once in Constantinople, Aemilian lived in exile. No successor was appointed to the see of Antioch during his absence, and he remained actively involved in imperial politics. A few years later, on 25 March 1078, he helped instigate the revolt that led to the deposition of Emperor Michael VII Doukas and the accession of Nikephoros III Botaneiates on 8 April of that year.

== Death and legacy ==
Aemilian did not enjoy the fruits of his political success for long. He died the following year, during the third indiction (1078–1079). His name is conspicuously absent from the patriarchal diptychs (and the Synodikon). This omission is almost certainly due to his later conflicts with the Komnenoi, who subsequently purged his memory from official ecclesiastical records, much as was done with other political enemies of the dynasty.
