= Dorotheus IV Ibn Al-Ahmar =

- Patriarch of Antioch
- Church: Melkite Church
- See: Patriarch of Antioch
- Installed: 1604
- Term ended: 1611
- Predecessor: Joachim Ibn Ziadah
- Successor: Athanasius II Dabbas

Personal details
- Died: 1611 Hasbaya, Lebanon

Patriarch Dorotheus IV Ibn Al-Ahmar (died 1611), sometime known also as Dorotheus V, was Melkite Patriarch of Antioch from 1604 to 1611.

== Life ==
Before being elected Greek Patriarch of Antioch in 1604, he served for eight years as auxiliary bishop of previous Patriarch Joachim Ibn Ziadah. His action as Patriarch is remembered for his clashes with the Ottoman civil authorities on the issue of taxations of the Christian community: he succeeded in having abolished the taxes on the clergy and in substituting Muslim collectors of taxes with Christian ones.

Because of his courage he was heavily attacked by his Turkish opponents who tried to depose him, unsuccessfully. He was stopped by the poison that killed him in 1611 while he was on pastoral visit at Hasbaya, Lebanon.
