= Theodore III of Antioch =

11th-century Patriarch of Antioch

Patriarch Theodore III
- Bishop of Antioch
- Native name: Θεόδωρος
- Church: Greek Orthodox Church
- See: Antioch
- Installed: 3 March 1034
- Term ended: 24 September 1042
- Predecessor: Elias II
- Successor: Basil II

Personal details
- Born: George
- Died: 24 September 1042
- Residence: Constantinople, Antioch

Theodore III Kritēs (Ancient Greek: Θεόδωρος ὁ κριτής; died 24 September 1042), previously known as George, was the Greek Orthodox Patriarch of Antioch from 1034 until his death in 1042.

== Early life and name ==
Theodore was consecrated as Patriarch of Antioch in Constantinople on the first Sunday of Lent, 3 March 1034. He held the office for 8 years, 6 months, and 21 days, dying on 24 September 1042.

His surname or title, kritēs (Greek: κριτής, lit. 'the judge'), is attested in a 14th-century manuscript from Jerusalem. More recent analysis suggests that kritēs was likely a corrupted form of the court title asekretis (ἀσηκρήτις).

== Patriarchate ==
=== Relations with the Georgian Church ===
A significant event during Theodore's patriarchate characterizes the ecclesiastical relations between the See of Antioch and the Georgian (Iberian) Church. According to the contemporary writer Nikon of the Black Mountain, an Iberian bishop began spreading discord. In response, Patriarch Theodore dispatched letters to Iberia, carried by his kouboukleios (a court official), to correct these scandals with the assistance of local holy fathers and bishops. Nikon records that these letters, which included the formal appointment (ἐπιτροπὴ καὶ χειροθεσία) of a Georgian catholicos named John, were preserved at the monastery of Saint Symeon. This Catholicos John is generally identified with Catholicos Chrysostom.

This account suggests that the Church of Iberia was in a state of genuine dependence on Antioch during this period, challenging later claims that the Georgian Church had already achieved complete autonomy by the mid-11th century. The evidence underscores Antioch's active jurisdictional role.

Nikon places this intervention during the reign of Emperor Constantine IX Monomachos, who ascended to the throne in June 1042. Consequently, this event must be situated within the final three months of Theodore's patriarchate, shortly before his death in September of that year.

== Seal ==
One seal attributed to him is contained in the Dumbarton Oaks Online Seals Catalog. The reverse contains the inscription Ancient Greek: Θεοδώρῳ πατριάρχῃ Θεουπόλεως Μεγάλης Ἀντιοχείας (Theodore patriarch of the Great Theoupolis Antioch). It is dated to the mid-eleventh century on stylistic grounds.
