= Cyril IV Dabbas =

Greek Orthodox Patriarch of Antioch (1560–1627)

- See: Greek Orthodox Patriarch of Antioch
- Installed: 1619
- Term ended: 1627
- Predecessor: Athanasius II Dabbas

Personal details
- Born: 1560
- Died: 1627 (aged 66–67)

Cyril IV Dabbas (Patriarche Kyrillos IV Dabbas) was Greek Orthodox Patriarch of Antioch (1619–1627). He succeeded his brother Athanasius II Dabbas as Patriarch after his death in 1619.
