= Theodore I of Antioch =

Patriarch of Antioch, 750/1 to 773/4

Patriarch Theodore I
- Bishop of Antioch
- Church: Greek Orthodox Church
- Installed: 750/1
- Term ended: 773/4
- Predecessor: Theophylact of Antioch
- Successor: Theodoret of Antioch

Personal details
- Died: c. 773/4
- Residence: Antioch, Transjordan
- Parents: Bikarios

Theodoros of Antioch (Ancient Greek: Θεόδωρος; died c. 773/74) was the Greek Orthodox Patriarch of Antioch from 750/51 to 773/74. He is primarily known for his ecclesiastical activities during the early Islamic period, including a brief exile and his opposition to iconoclasm.

== Early life and patriarchate ==
Theodoros was the son of Bikarios. He was elevated to the position of Patriarch of Antioch in the year 751.

== Exile and return ==
In 756, Theodoros was exiled by the Abbasid governor Salih ibn Ali to his homeland in the "land of the Moabites" (Ancient Greek: εἰς τὴν Μωαβῖτιν χώραν, modern-day Transjordan) on charges of allegedly betraying secrets to the Romans. This exile appears to have been either short-lived or did not prevent him from continuing his patriarchal duties, as he is recorded as actively participating in regional ecclesiastical affairs shortly thereafter.

== Opposition to iconoclasm ==
In 764/65, Theodoros joined Patriarch Theodore I of Jerusalem and Patriarch Cosmas of Alexandria in anathematizing the iconoclastic Bishop Cosmas of Epiphaneia in Syria. This joint action demonstrated the continued coordination among the Chalcedonian patriarchates in the Levant during the 8th century, despite the political fragmentation of the region.

== Relations with Rome ==
According to later accounts, Theodoros, alongside the Patriarch of Alexandria, allegedly signed a synodical letter dispatched by Patriarch Theodore I of Jerusalem to Pope Paul I in 767. However, this correspondence reportedly did not reach Rome until the pontificate of Pope Constantine II (767–769).

== Historiography and sources ==
The primary historical sources for Theodoros's life include the chronicle of Theophanes the Confessor, the Monumenta Germaniae Historica (Epistolae), and the Annals of Eutychius of Alexandria. Modern scholarly discussions of his patriarchate and the broader context of Antioch in the 6th to 8th centuries are detailed in the works of Giorgio Fedalto and Clive Foss.
