= Nicholas II of Antioch =

11th-century Patriarch of Antioch

Patriarch Nikolaos II
- Bishop of Antioch
- Native name: Νικόλαος
- Church: Greek Orthodox Church
- See: Antioch
- Installed: 17 January 1025
- Term ended: 8 October 1030
- Predecessor: John III
- Successor: Elias II
- Previous post: Hegumenos of the Stoudios Monastery

Personal details
- Died: 8 October 1030

Nikolaos II (Ancient Greek: Νικόλαος; Arabic: نيقولاوس, Nīqūlāwus, died 8 October 1030) was the Orthodox (Melkite) Patriarch of Antioch from 17 January 1025 to 8 October 1030. Prior to his elevation to the patriarchate, he was a monk, a priest, and the hegumenos (abbot) of the Stoudios Monastery in Constantinople.

== Biography ==
=== Early career ===
Nikolaos is first attested as the hegumenos of the Stoudios Monastery in a manuscript note dated March 1018 (first indiction; 6526 anno mundi) in Vat. gr. ms. 1675 (formerly Cryptensis 15), folio 333v.

=== Patriarchate ===
On 17 January 1025, Nikolaos, who was still hegumenos of the Stoudios Monastery, was consecrated in Constantinople as the Patriarch of Antioch, following a vacancy of three and a half years. He was succeeded as hegumenos by Alexios Studites.

As Patriarch, Nikolaos oversaw the transfer of the relics of his predecessor, Patriarch Christophoros, from the "Great Church" of Antioch—which at that time was not the ruined Constantinian church in the north of the city on the Orontes island, but the Church of Cassianus in the medieval city center—to the "House of Saint Petros".

The Vita Symeonis Treverensis claims that an unnamed Patriarch of Antioch knew and highly esteemed Saint Symeon of Trier, who was in Antioch around 1025/26. This patriarch was possibly Nikolaos, although the reliability of the Vita Symeonis regarding events in the East is considered questionable.

=== Relations with the Syriac Orthodox Church ===
According to the chronicle of Michael the Syrian, Nikolaos maintained good relations with the Syriac Orthodox (Jacobite) Patriarch of Antioch, John VIII bar Abdoun. Their friendship reportedly began when Nikolaos heard of a miraculous healing of the Roman governor of Antioch, who suffered from leprosy, performed by John VIII. Following this, Nikolaos initiated contact and corresponded with him over an extended period.

In the summer of 1029, John VIII bar Abdoun was accused and brought before the synodal court in Constantinople. According to Michael the Syrian, Nikolaos and his bishops were also in Constantinople at the time. However, they refused to participate in the synod convened in October 1029 by the Ecumenical Patriarch Alexios I Studites, arguing that John VIII was a Christian just as they were.

Nikolaos's refusal to condemn John VIII is further indicated by the absence of his name from the participant list of the synod published by Alexios I in May 1030. Following Nikolaos's death, Alexios I was able to persuade Nikolaos's successor, Elias, to recognize and sign the condemnation of John VIII in April 1032.

== Bibliography ==
- Grumel, Venance (1934). "Le patriarcat et les patriarches d'Antioche sous la seconde domination byzantine (969-1084)". Échos d'Orient. 33 (174): 129–147. doi:10.3406/rebyz.1934.2786.
- Jenkins, Romilly J. H.; Mango, Cyril (1961). "A Synodicon of Antioch and Lacedaemonia". Dumbarton Oaks Papers. 15: 225–242. doi:10.2307/1291182. JSTOR 1291182.
- Todt, Klaus-Peter (2001). "Region und griechisch-orthodoxes Patriarchat von Antiocheia in Mittelbyzantinischer Zeit (969-1084)". Byzantinische Zeitschrift. 94 (1): 239–267. doi:10.1515/byzs.2001.94.1.239.
