= Athanasius II Dabbas =

- Patriarch of Antioch
- Church: Melkite Church
- See: Patriarch of Antioch
- Installed: September 1611
- Term ended: 1619
- Predecessor: Dorotheus IV Ibn Al-Ahmar
- Successor: Ignatius III Atiyah and Cyril IV Dabbas.

Personal details
- Born: 1552
- Died: 1619 (aged 66–67) Tripoli (Lebanon)

Patriarch Athanasius II Dabbas (died 1619), sometime known also as Athanasius III, was Eastern Orthodox Patriarch of Antioch from 1611 to 1619.

== Life ==
Athanasius II Dabbas succeeded to be elected Patriarch because he promised to the Damascenes to pay annually the deficit of the tax required of the Christians (Kharaj tax) by the Ottomans. Thus he was consecrated Patriarch in September 1611.

In 1612 he appointed and consecrated metropolitan bishop of Aleppo Meletios Karmah (who twenty years later became patriarch), with whom he later argued for financial reasons or for Meletios’ contacts with the Franciscans. In 1614 Athanasius went to Constantinople to ask Ecumenical Patriarch Timothy II to depose Meletios, who also came to Constantinople. The two prelates, Athanasius and Meletios, were then able to reach an agreement. Athanasius had a positive opinion of the Latin missionaries in Syria, and in 1617 he probably held a pro-Catholic synod.

Athanasius was not able to uphold the promise of paying the tax required of the Christians, and thus in 1619 he was imprisoned by the Ottoman governor of Damascus and was put in jail. After he paid a large ransom he was allowed to leave for Tripoli (Lebanon) where he died of illness in 1619.
