= Elias I of Antioch (Chalcedonian) =

10th-century Patriarch of Antioch

Patriarch Elias I
- Bishop of Antioch
- Native name: Ἠλίας
- Church: Greek Orthodox Church
- See: Antioch
- Installed: 907
- Term ended: 934
- Predecessor: Simeon I
- Successor: Theodosios II

Elias (Ancient Greek: Ἠλίας), fl. 907–934, was the Chalcedonian Patriarch of Antioch from 907 to 934. Prior to his elevation to the patriarchate, he served as a secretary at the Abbasid Caliph's court in Baghdad. He is noted for his diplomatic engagements with the Eastern Roman Empire, particularly concerning the Tetragamy controversy and the treatment of prisoners of war.

== Early life and appointment ==
Before becoming patriarch, Elias worked as a secretary (Arabic: kātib) at the Abbasid Caliph's court in Baghdad. He was appointed as the Chalcedonian Patriarch of Antioch (referred to in Arabic sources as biṭrīq or biṭrīrk) in the fourth year of the reign of Caliph al-Muktafi, which corresponds to 294 AH (22 October 906 – 11 October 907). His patriarchate and activities are documented in various primary historical sources, including the annals of Eutychius of Alexandria, as well as the works of al-Tanūḫī, Hilāl aṣ-Ṣābi’, and Ibn al-Ǧawzī.

== Diplomatic activities ==
Shortly after taking office, Elias may have sent a legate to Constantinople in connection with the Tetragamy controversy arising from the fourth marriage of Emperor Leo VI.

Around 922, Elias and Patriarch Leontius I of Jerusalem jointly dispatched an emissary to Constantinople. This emissary was accompanied by an envoy from the governor of the border regions. At the instigation of the Abbasid vizier of Baghdad, 'Ali b. 'Isa, the patriarchs authored a letter to the Roman Emperors Romanos I Lekapenos and Constantine VII Porphyrogennetos. The letter warned the emperors that their treatment of prisoners of war was inconsistent with the Christian faith and threatened them with anathema if they did not alter their behavior.

The Emperors rejected these accusations but permitted the envoys to visit the prisoners held in the Praitorion (dār al-balāṭ). The chronological classification of this second embassy, as well as a reply letter from the Byzantine emperor to Baghdad by Nicholas Mystikos, is dated to around July 922 by most scholars, though an earlier date (913/914) has also been proposed.
