= Adana Archaeology Museum =

Archaeology museum in Adana, Turkey

- Adana Arkeoloji Müzesi
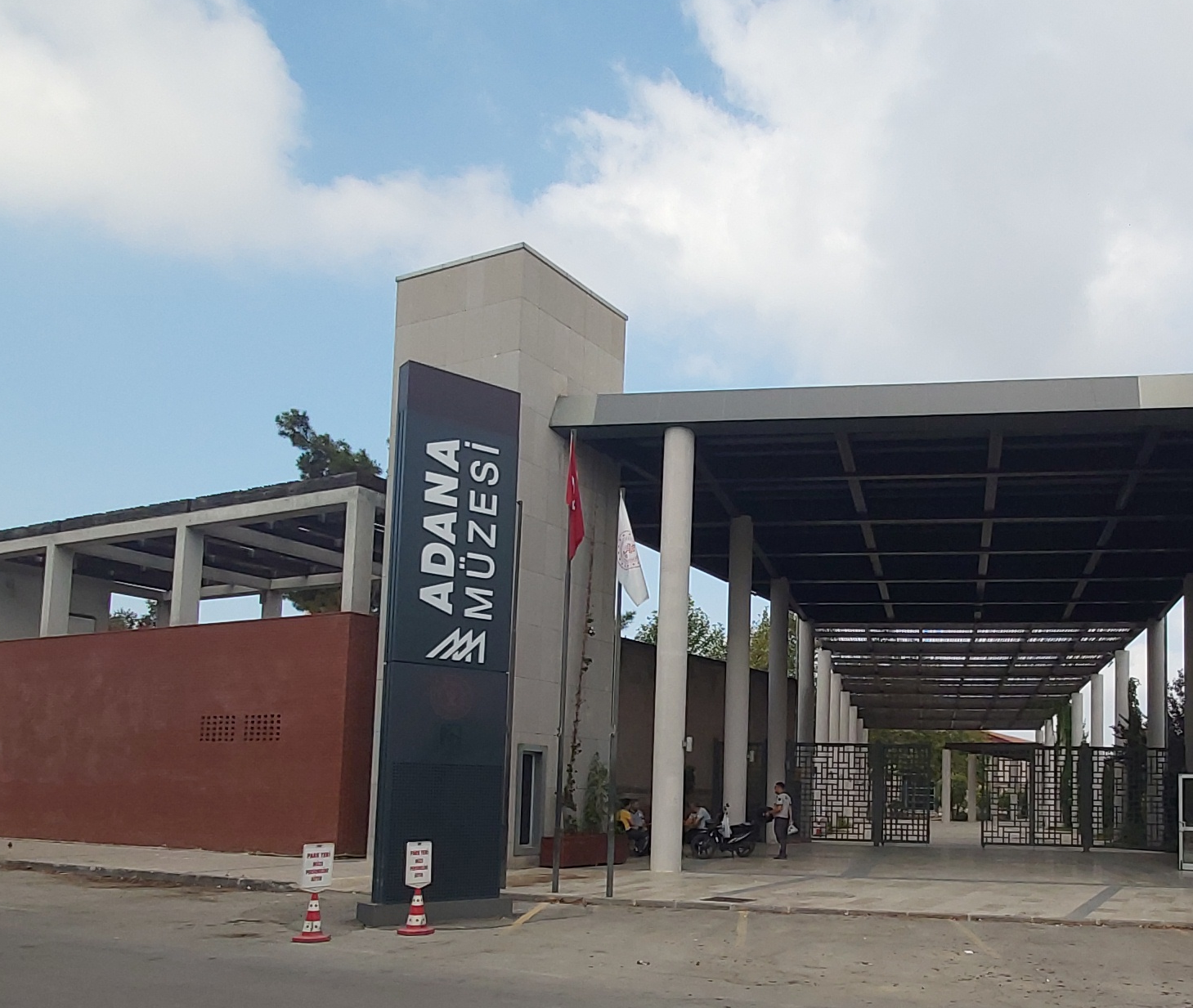

- Location within Turkey
- Established: 1919
- Location: Döşeme Mahallesi, Ahmet Cevdet Yağ Bulvarı, D:No:7, 01060 Seyhan, Adana, Turkey
- Coordinates: 36.99489°N 35.31383°E
- Type: Archeological
- Area: 588,000 sq ft (54,600 m^{2}) in 94 Galleries

Adana Archaeology Museum (Turkish: Adana Arkeoloji Müzesi) is a museum in Adana that houses the historical heritage of Cilicia. The museum is currently located at the former Simyonoglu (later Milli Mensucat) textile plant that was built in 1906 by Aristidi Simyonoglu as being the largest manufacturing plant of the region. It is one of the oldest archaeological museums in Turkey.

== History ==
Adana Archaeology Museum was founded in 1919 during the French rule of Cilicia. The collection initially comprised diverse objects found by local civilians and French military personnel; an agreement with the Imperial Museum in Constantinople also allowed for the transfer of certain antiquities held in Silifke to the Adana museum. After the formation of the Republic in 1924, Alyanakzade Halil Kamil Bey from Adana was appointed as museum director and the collection was moved in 1928 to the medrese section of the defunct Cafer Pasha Mosque and then opened to the public.

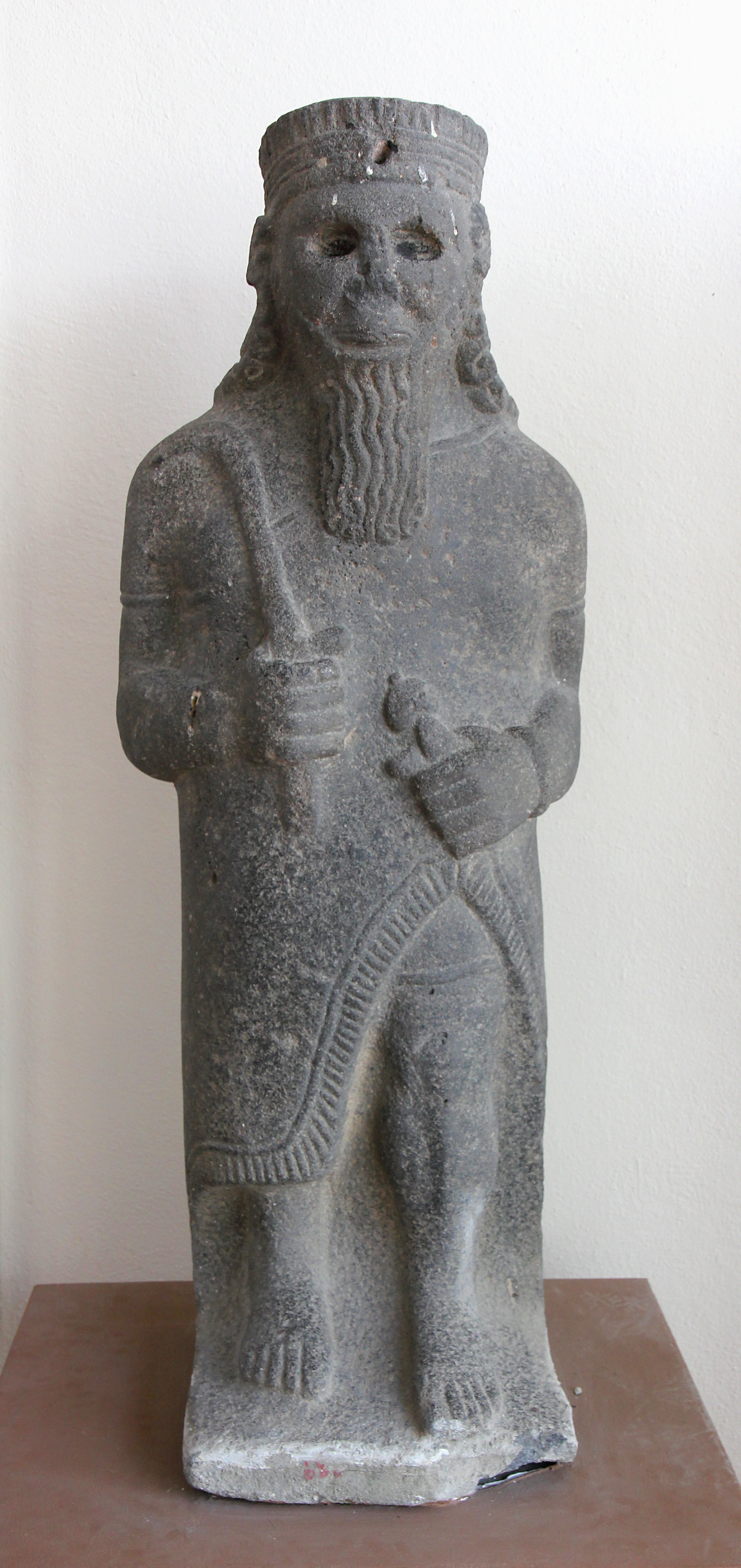
Tel Halaf statue

In 1950, the museum had moved to the former Greek Orthodox Church at Kuruköprü. Items from the early ages of Cilicia which was discovered during the excavations carried out at Tarsus/Gözlükule (1934), Mersin/Yumuktepe (1936), Ceyhan/Sirkeli (1938) and Yüreğir/Misis (1958) in particular, were collected at the museum which eventually became filled to the brim with the ethnographic items collected by museum director Ali Rıza Yalman (Yalkın) between 1933 and 1940. This was also the only regional museum housing items either through bought or obtained through court orders from an area covering Kahramanmaraş to Gaziantep. The museum had moved to the west bank of Seyhan River at the intersection of E5 state road and Fuzuli street on January 7, 1972.

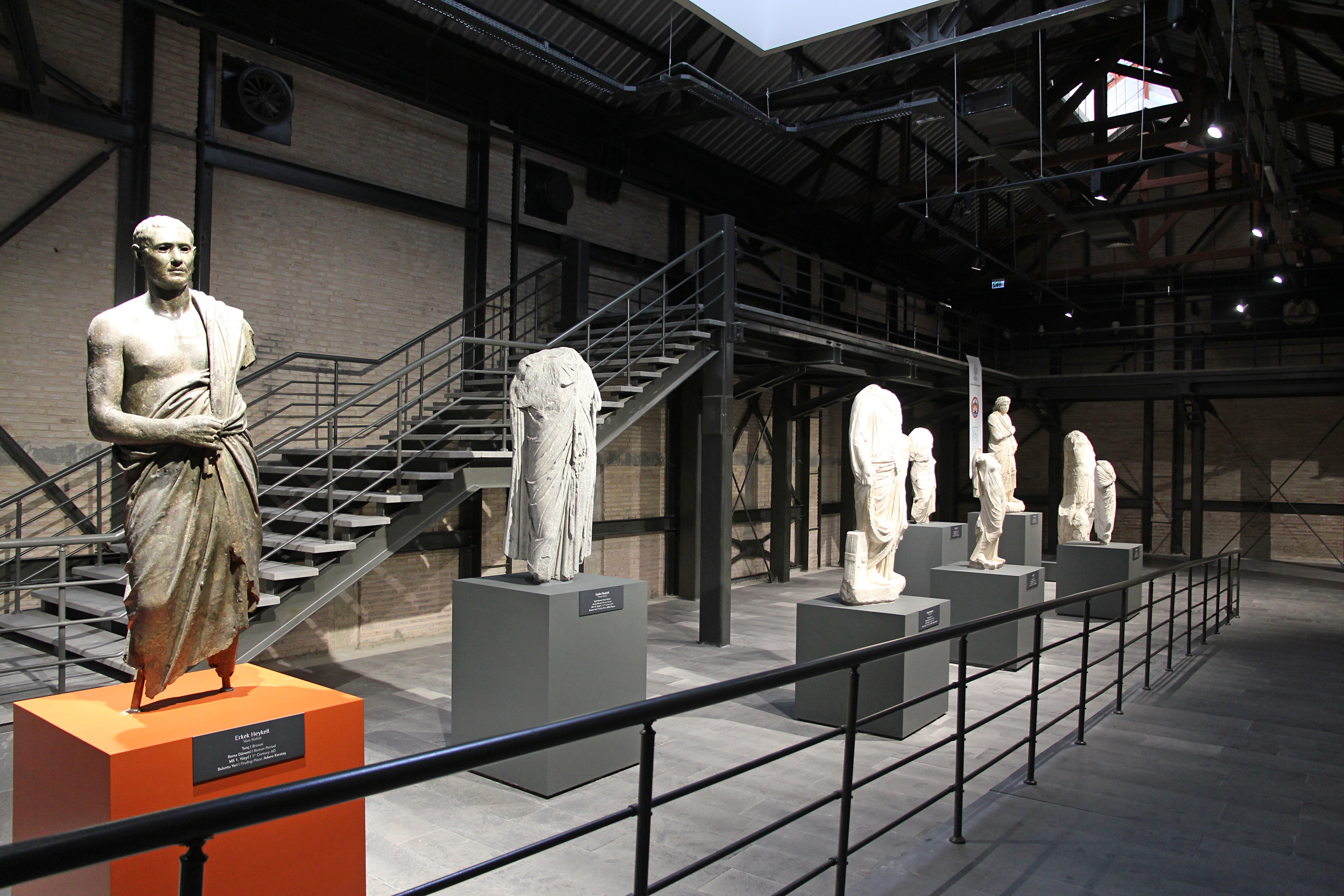

Adana Museum Complex (Turkish: Adana Müze Kompleksi) project was initiated in early 2010s to gather the museums that are administered by the central government. The former Simyonoglu (later Milli Mensucat) textile manufacturing plant was chosen as the site of the complex since the plant had an authentic environment accommodating textile machines from 1906 at a very large area. The museum initially comprised the City Museum, Museum of Agriculture, Museum of Industry, Museum of Ethnography, Children's Museum and Mosaic Museum. In 2019, Adana Archaeology Museum moved to the site. A large mosaics section also opened at this time. Many objects formerly in the garden of the old museum are now indoors and protected from the elements.

== The Collections ==
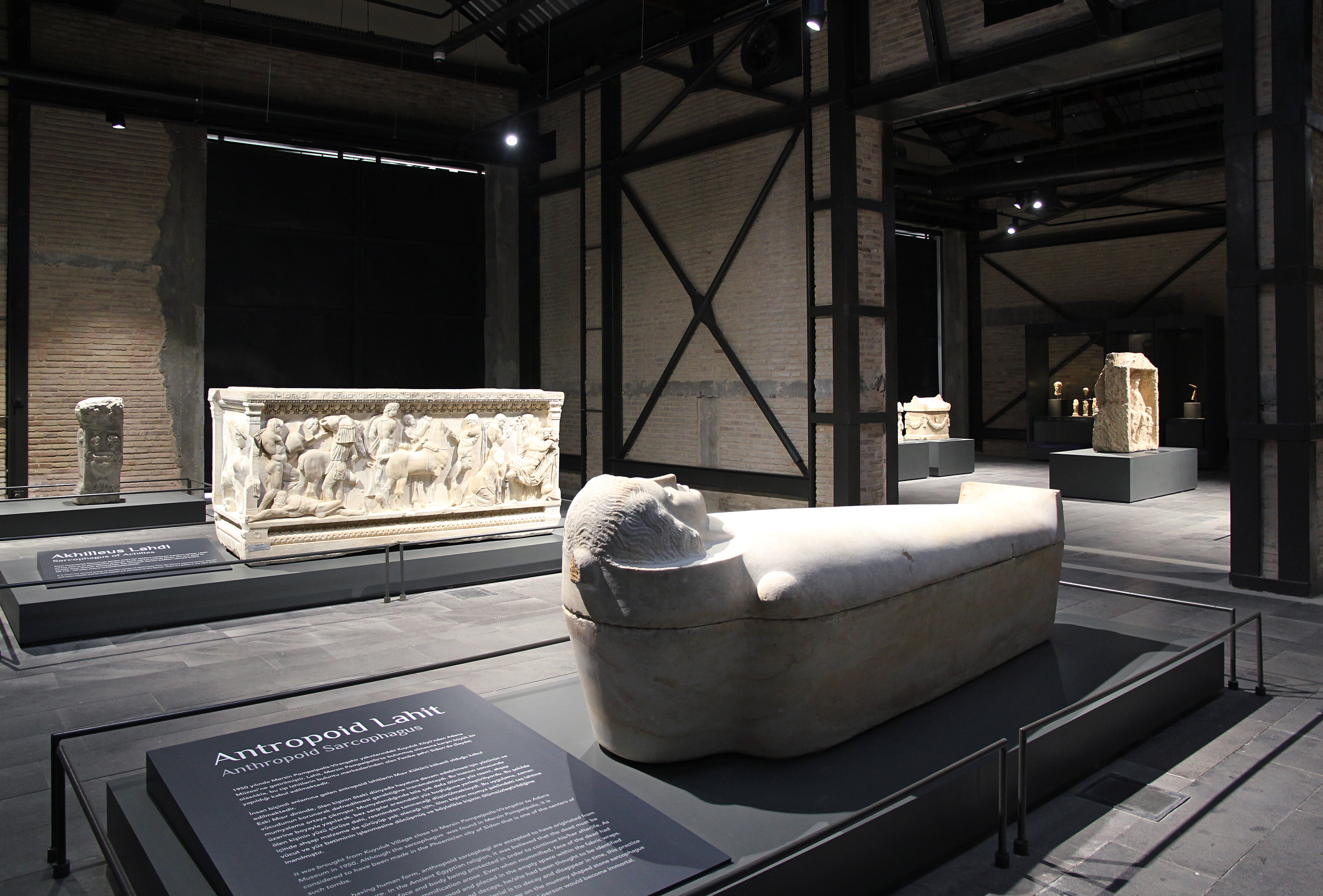

The museum contains many objects from the Hittite period, such as a statue of a god on a chariot, and many steles. But objects from earlier and later periods (Neolithic, Bronze Age, Iron Age, Archaic, Roman, Byzantine, Ottoman) also abound. Roman exhibits include sarcophagi with rich garland decorations, jugs, catapult shots, inscriptions, altars and various architectural elements, glassware, ceramics and jewellery. Finds from specific excavations in the region are displayed separately. A marble sarcophagus from Tarsus depicting the Trojan wars in high relief is known as the Achilles sarcophagus. There is also a sarcophagus carved with a Medusa from the ancient city of Augusta which was submerged beneath the Seyhan Dam Reservoir, and a life-sized bronze Karataş statue from the ancient city of Magarsus in Karataş.

The museum houses the only known inscription mentioning Apollonius of Tyana from 3–4th century CE

== Gallery ==
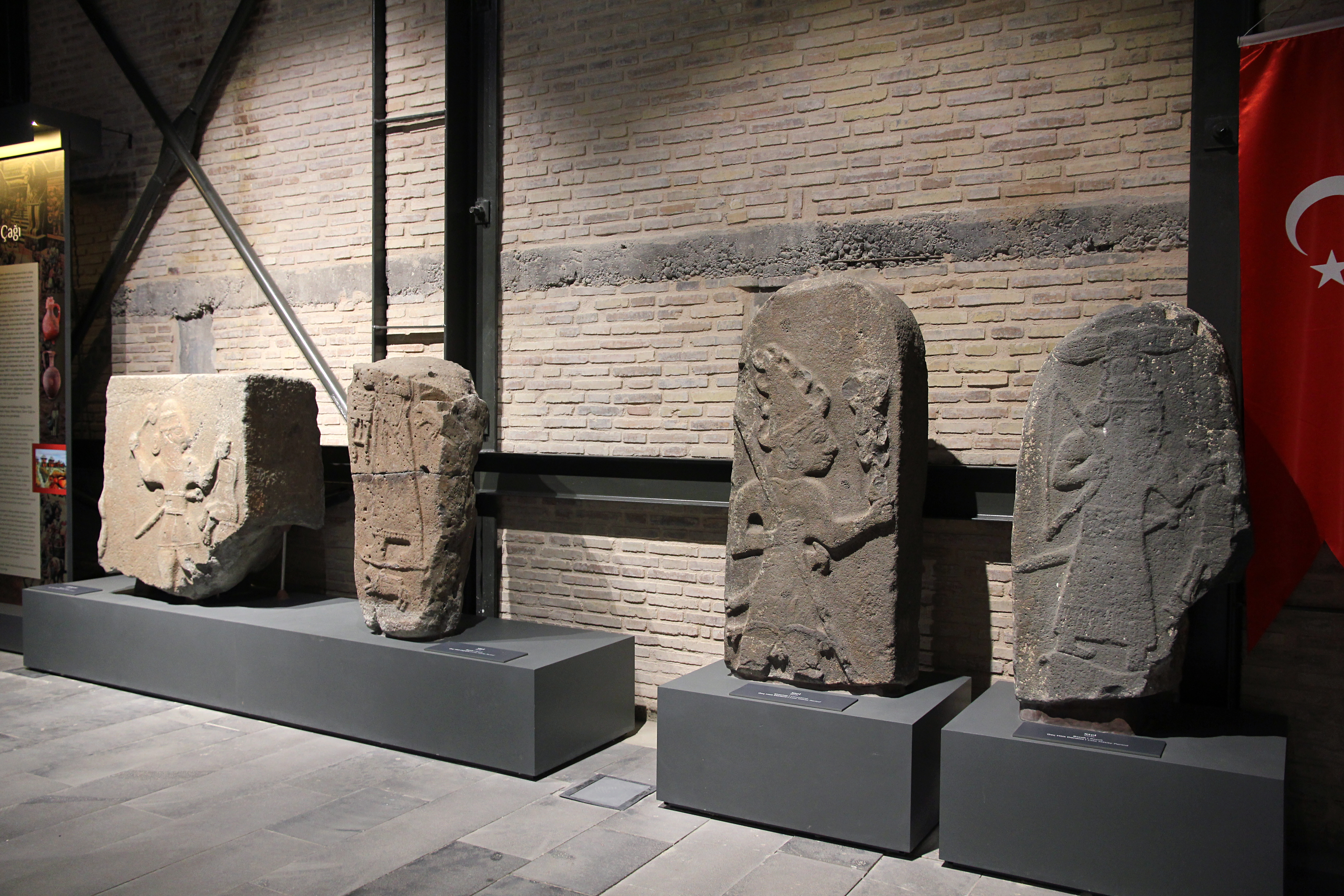

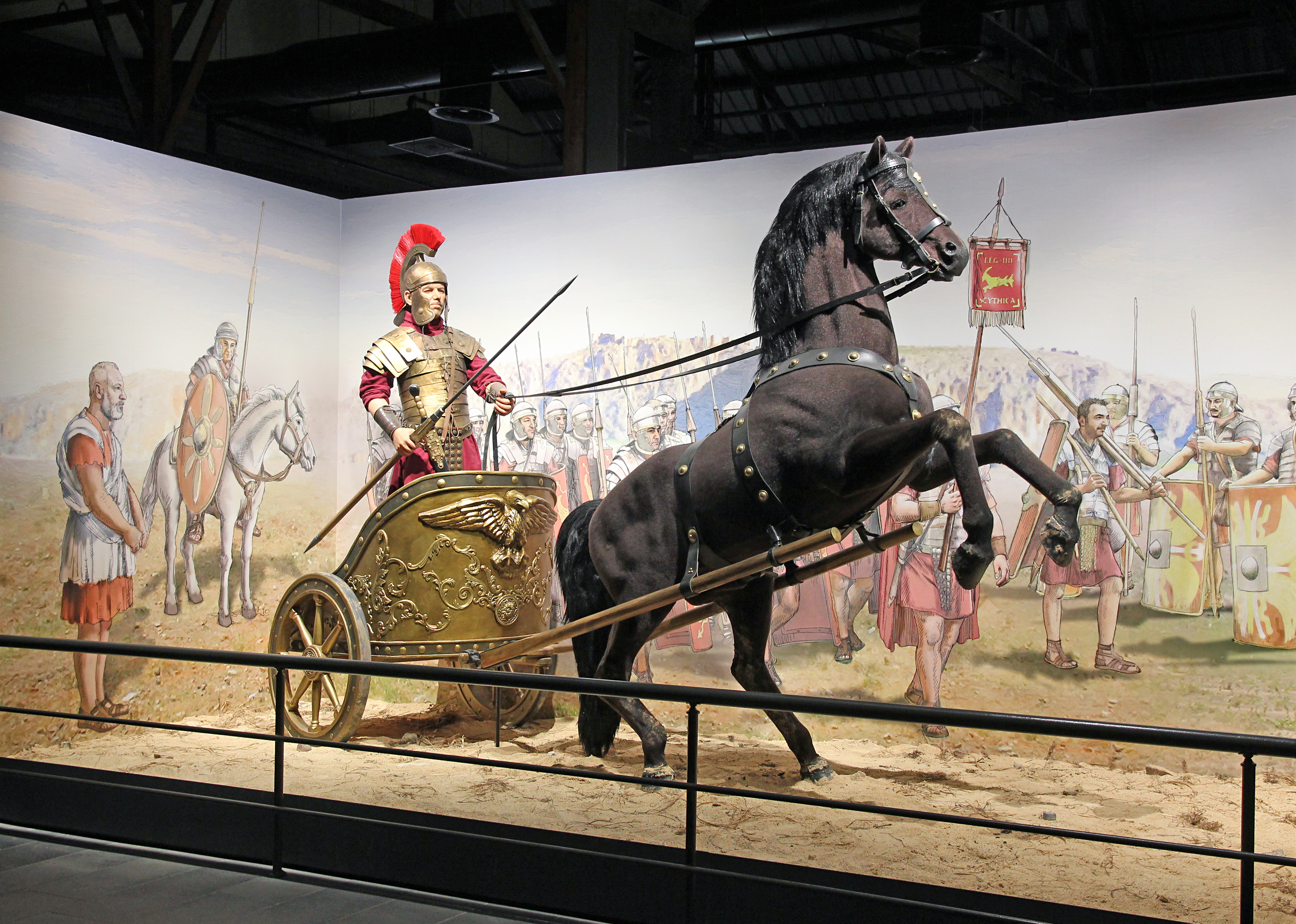

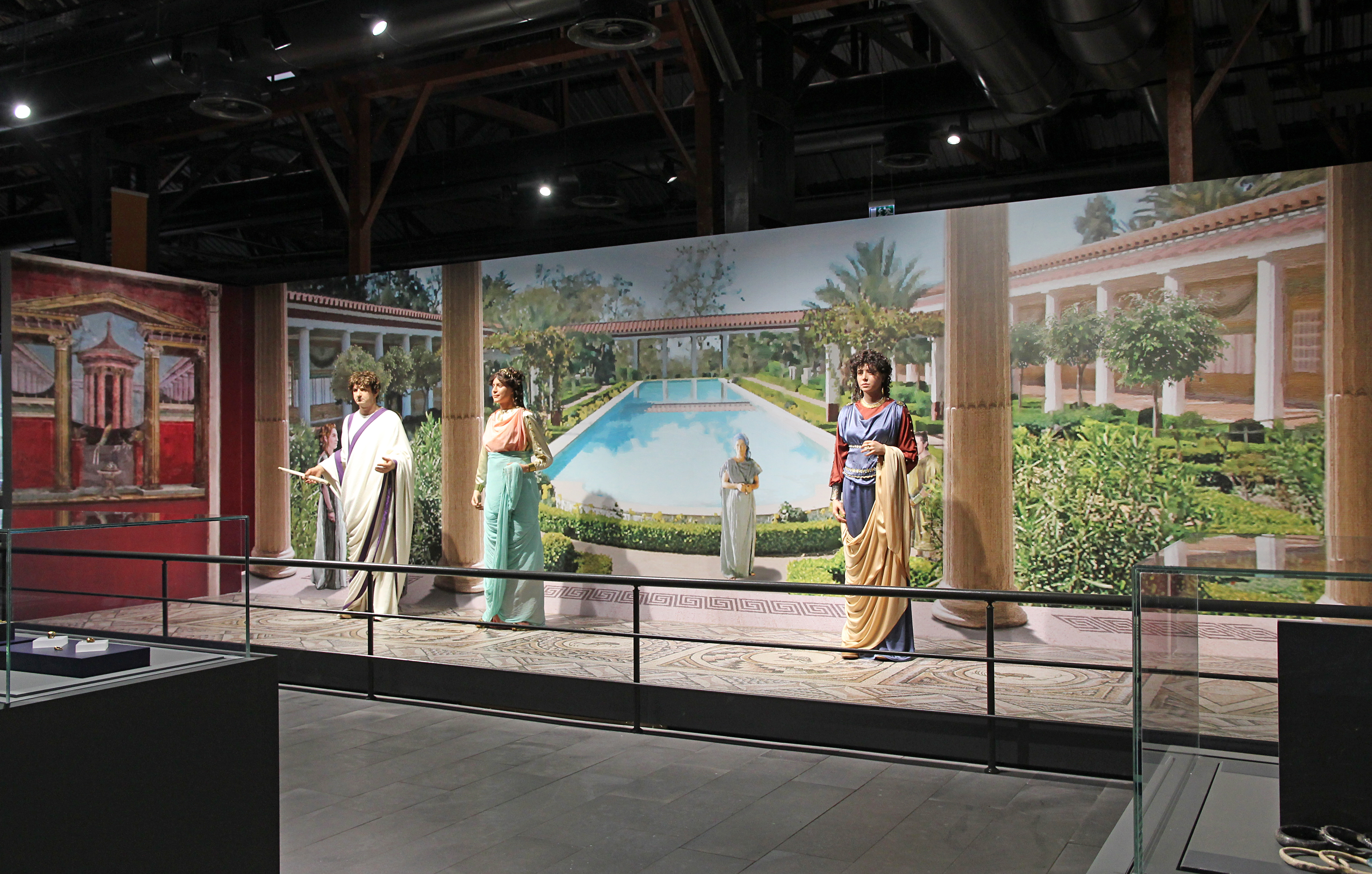

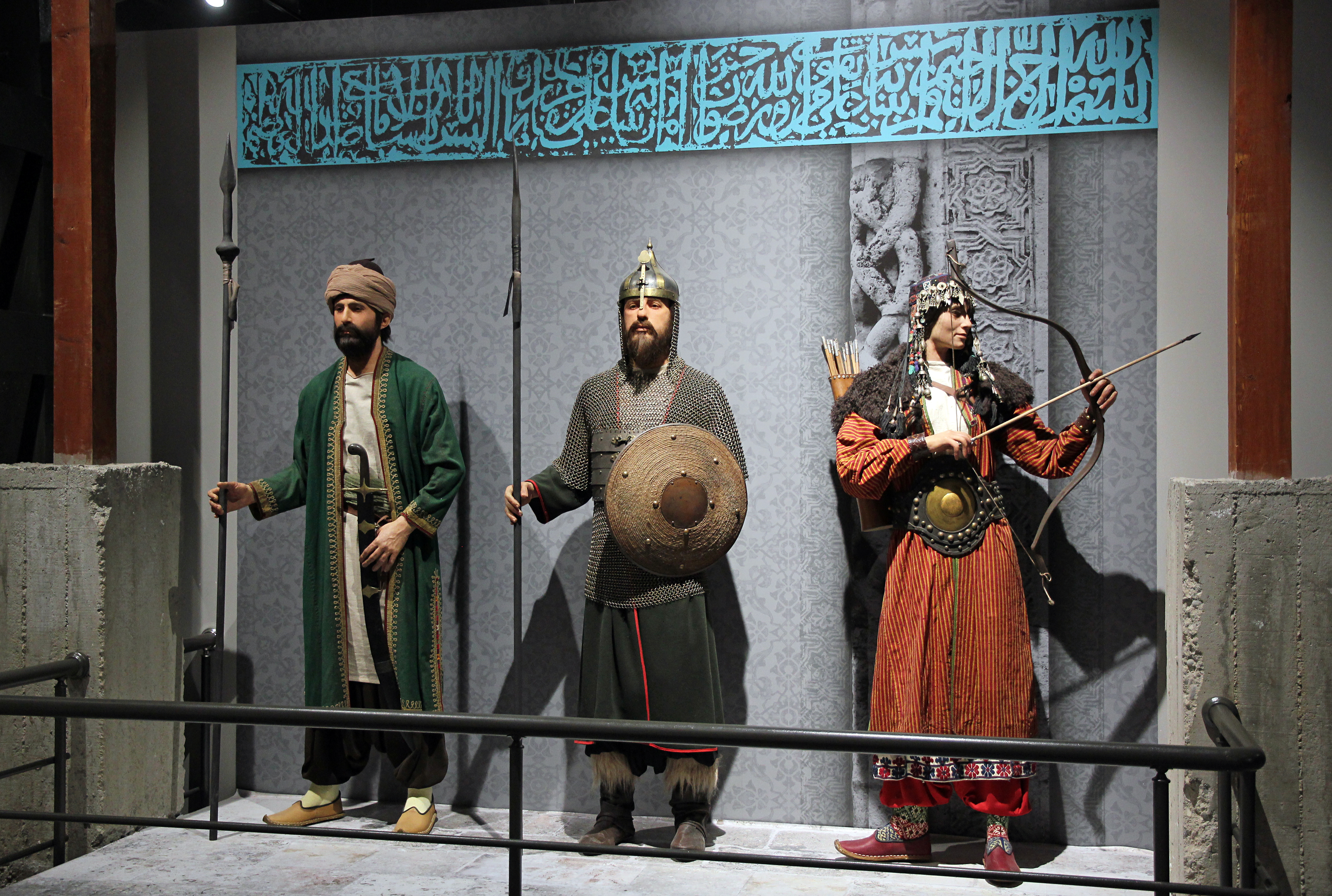

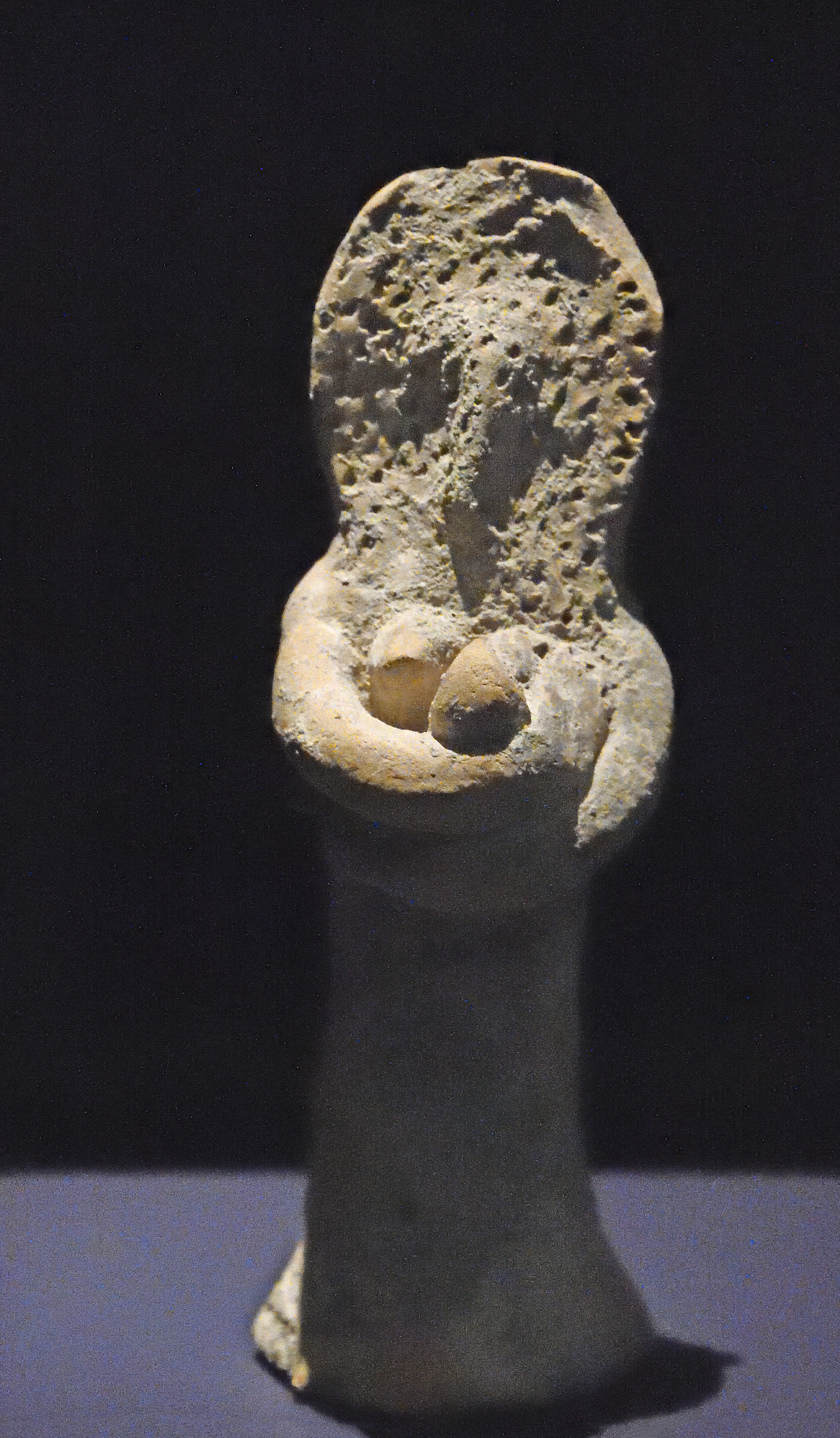
Adana Archaeological Museum Woman figurine Terra cotta Early Bronze Age

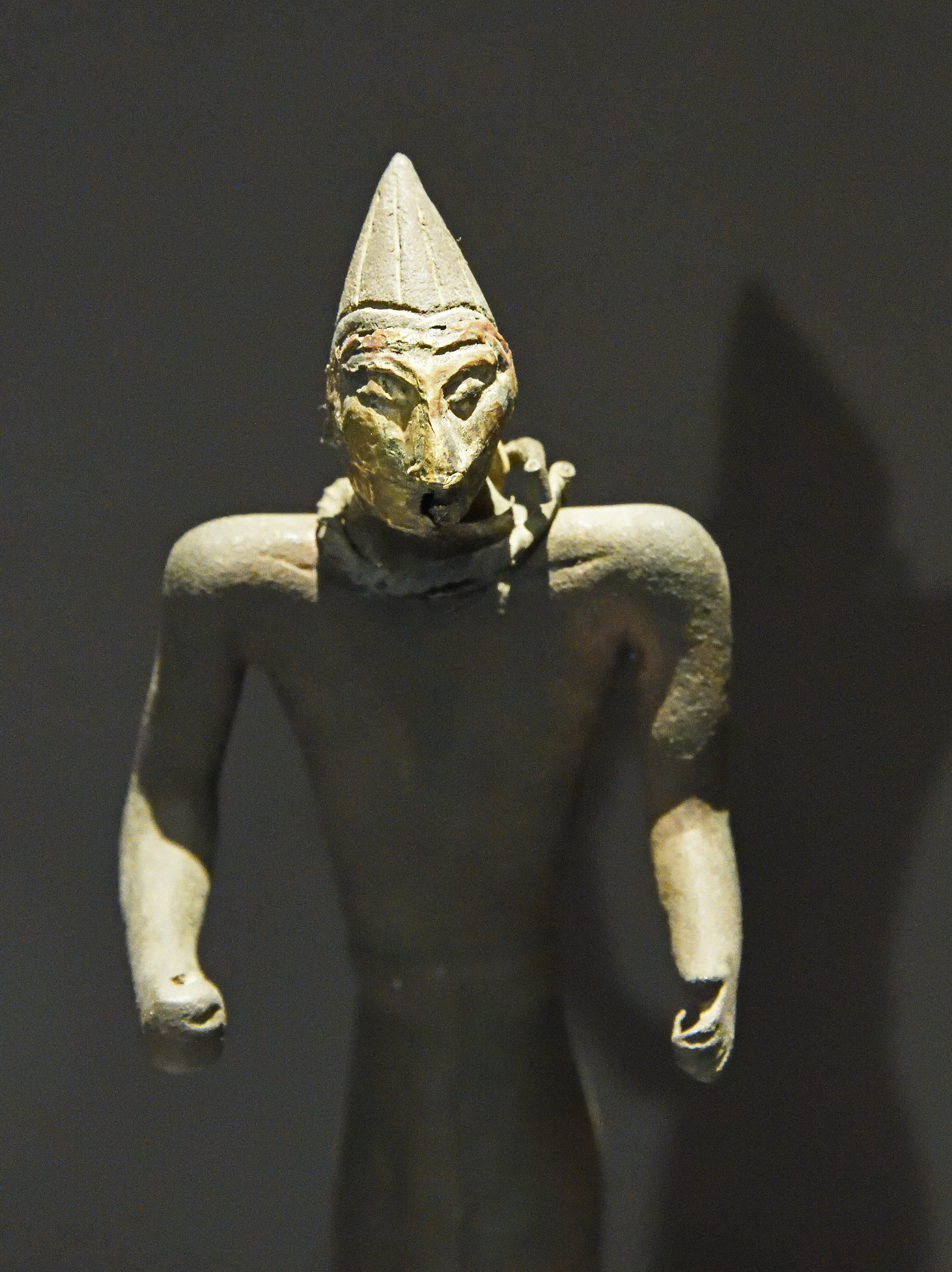
Adana Archaeological Museum Hittite Masked Human figure

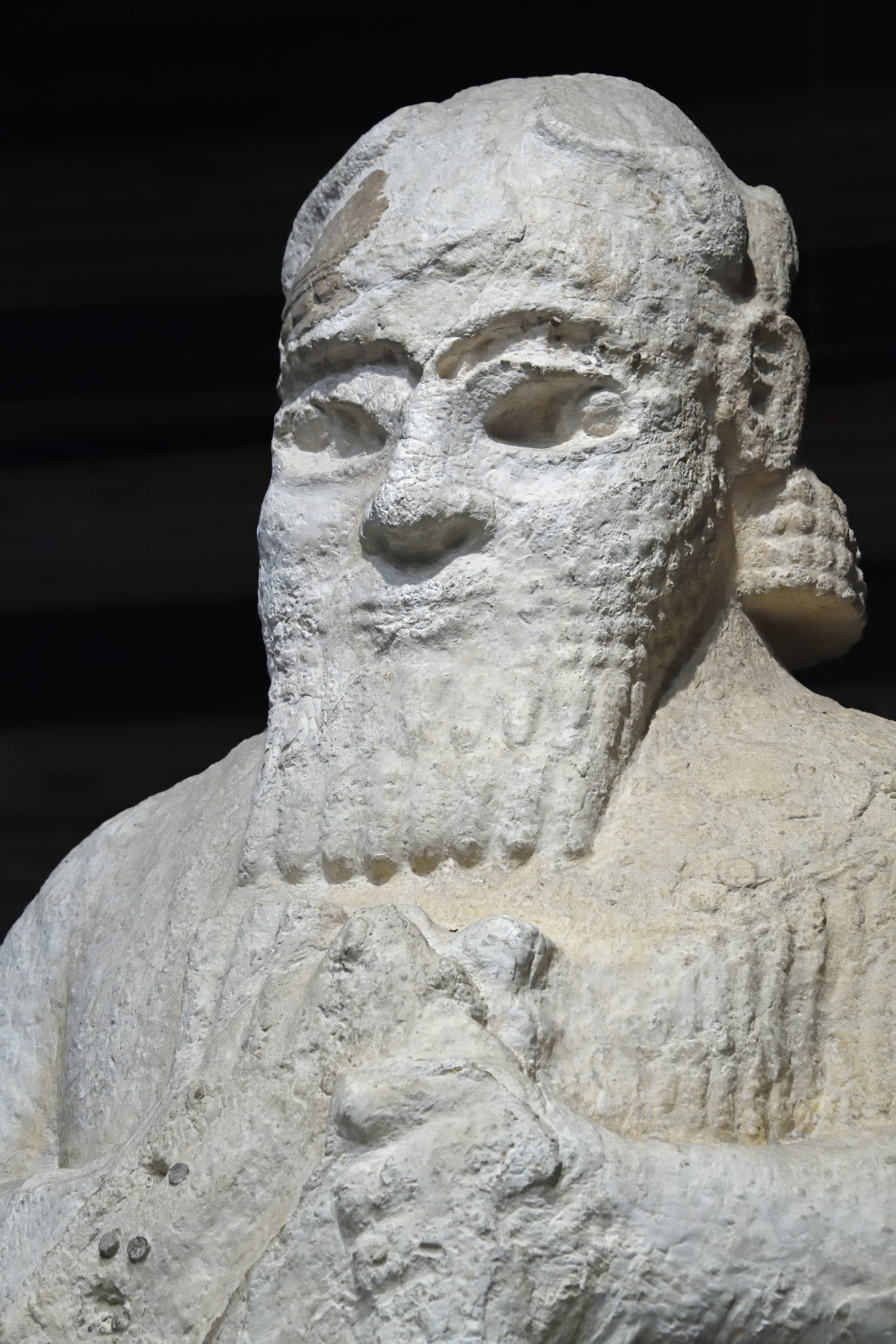
Adana Archaeological Museum Neo-Hittite Tarhunda-Baal on chariot

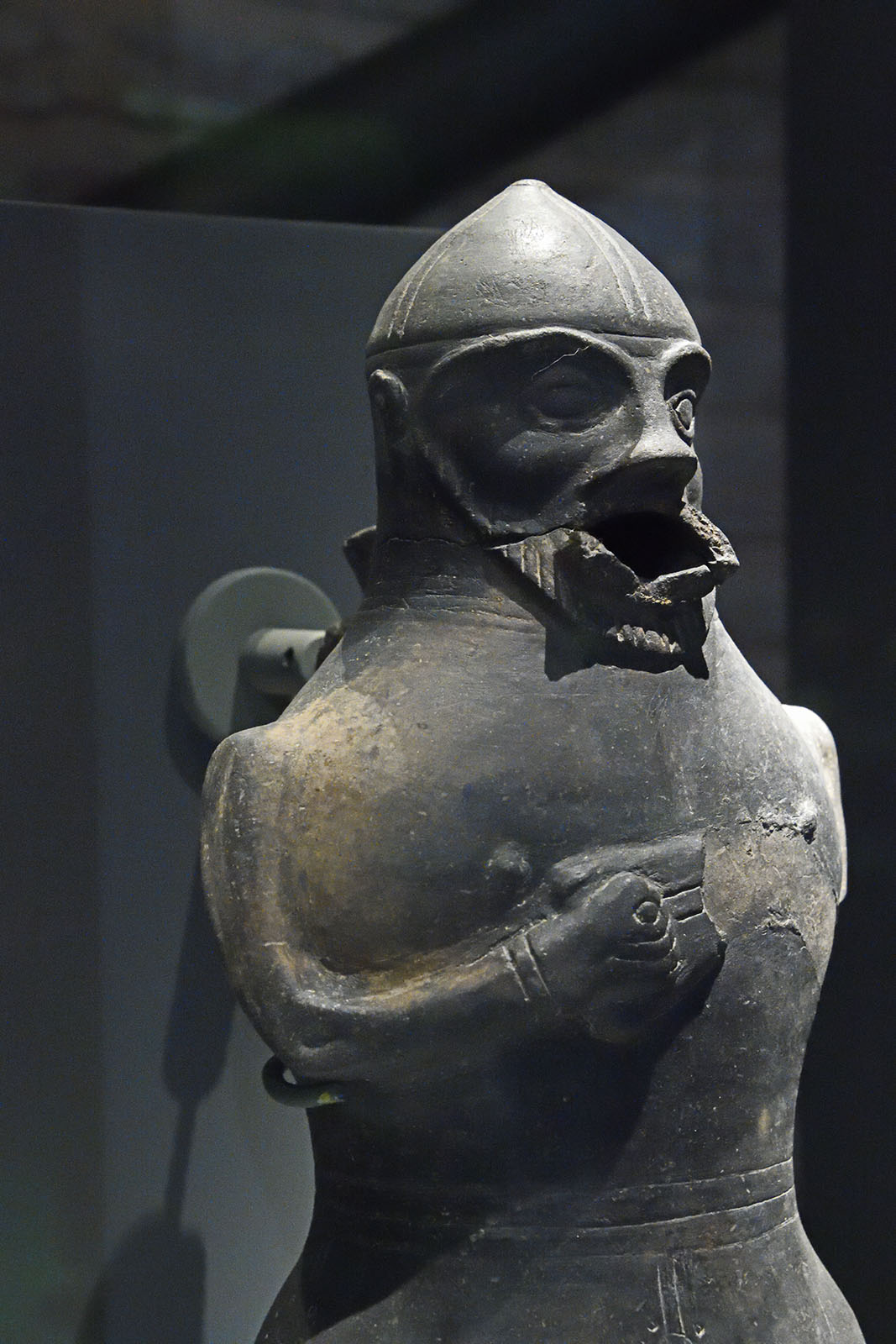
Adana Archaeological Museum Hittite Anthropomorphic terra cotta jug
