= Euthymius II Karmah =

- Patriarch of Antioch
- Church: Melkite Greek Church
- See: Patriarch of Antioch
- Installed: 1 May 1634
- Term ended: 1 January 1635
- Predecessor: Ignatius III Atiyah
- Successor: Euthymius III of Chios

Personal details
- Born: Abdel-Karim Karmah; 1572 Hama, Syria
- Died: 1 January 1635 (aged 62–63) Damascus

Patriarch Abdel-Karim Meletios Euthymius II Karmah (1572–1635) was Melkite Patriarch of Antioch from 1634 to 1635. He had been a leading figure in the Melkite Church and metropolitan bishop of Aleppo. He died a few months after his election as Patriarch, probably poisoned because his will to proceed with a union with the Catholic Church.

== Metropolitan of Aleppo ==
Abdel-Karim Karmah was born in 1572 in Hama, Syria, son of a priest. In his twenties he went to Jerusalem where he entered in the monastery of Saint Michel, a cloister associated with Mar Saba Monastery. After two years of prayer, he was asked by his bishop Simeon to return to Hama where he was ordained deacon and later priest. A few years later he moved for service to Aleppo where he got appraisal as preacher.

On 12 February 1612 Karmah was consecrated metropolitan bishop of Aleppo by Patriarch Athanasius II Dabbas, and he took the name of the saint of that day, ‘'Meletios'’. One of his aims as metropolitan was to increase the literacy and the education of his flock and his presbyter, which needed liturgical and religious books in Arabic. Thus Karmah in 1612 published in Arabic the Typicon of Mar Saba, a Liturgicon and a Sticherarion, but to go on with further publications he needed money. For this purpose he asked a grant to Rome, and he relied on the Franciscans missionaries for financial support and for teaching. He succeeded also to persuade the Vatican to start preparing an Arabic translation of the whole Bible, something quite difficult to obtain in the years after the Council of Trent, but the translation took time and only the Gospels were published.

While Karmah was metropolitan of Aleppo, he was attacked many times. The first time was in 1614 and he had to go to Constantinople to defend himself in front of Patriarch Timothy II of Constantinople, who decided to confirm him in his position. Some years later he was strongly attached by the claiming-patriarch Cyril IV Dabbas because he supported the other claiming-patriarch, Ignatius III Atiyah. In 1624 Cyril Dabbas moved to Aleppo but Karmah always refused to concelebrate with him. Karmah went on refusing to recognize Cyrill even at the celebration of Easter 1625. Thus Cyrill Dabbas accused him in front of the Ottoman authorities who arrested and processed him. Karmah was beaten and fined a large amount of money, which was offered by the Christians of Aleppo to have him released. In 1627 he had again to return to Constantinople to defend himself, also this time successfully. In 1628 he took part to the Synod of Ras-Baalbek where, along with all the other Melkite bishops, deposed Cyrill declaring Ignatius III to be the sole patriarch.

== Patriarch ==
A few months after the bloody death of Patriarch Ignatius III Atiyah, he was elected as new Patriarch by the Christians of Damascus and consecrated on 1 May 1634, taking the name of Euthimios III. Because of his friendly relations with the Western missionaries he had in the previous years, his first decision as Patriarch was to send a delegation to Rome to renew the union with the Catholic Church set forth in the Council of Florence. He also planned to open schools with Jesuit teachers.

Because of these openings towards the Catholic Church, he clashed with the pro-Orthodox and pro-Turkish parties into the Melkite Church. In the meantime his delegation arrived to Rome and obtained a positive response from the Propaganda Fide, he died in Damascus on 1 January 1635, probably poisoned because his will to proceed with a union with the Catholic Church.
