= Theodosius III of Antioch =

Eleventh-century Patriarch of Antioch

Patriarch Theodosios III
- Bishop of Antioch
- Church: Greek Orthodox Church
- Installed: before 30 August 1057
- Term ended: after 4 April 1059
- Predecessor: John IV of Antioch
- Successor: Aemilian of Antioch

Personal details
- Born: Constantinople
- Residence: Antioch

Theodosios III Chrysoberges served as the Patriarch of Antioch during the mid-11th century. He was in office prior to August 30, 1057, and still occupied the patriarchal seat on April 4, 1059. The exact dates of the start the end of his patriarchate remain unknown.

== Character and Reputation ==
The Life of George the Hagiorite provides a highly favorable assessment of Theodosios's character and intellect. It describes him as Constantinopolitanus, vir summus, philosophiae peritus et in utraque vita probatus (a native Constantinopolitan, a man of great statue, skilled in philosophy, and a figure who was proven and virtuous in both secular and religious life.) He maintained contact with highly prominent figures in Constantinople and across the Eastern Roman Empire. Numerous copies of his seals have been found and catalogued, and he is mentioned in a surviving letter by Michael Psellos.

== Accession and Political Involvement ==
Theodosios was appointed to the patriarchate by Emperor Michael VI Bringas. In late August 1057, he was present in Constantinople and actively participated in the coup d'état that overthrew Michael VI and installed Isaac I Komnenos on the throne. It is unclear whether or not his participation in this coup implied an ideological alliance with the powerful Patriarch of Constantinople, Michael I Cerularius. Because Michael VI was not favorable to Cerularius, it is unlikely that Cerularius influenced Theodosios's initial appointment. Theodosios’s decision to join the conspiracy may well have been a pragmatic act of political opportunism, recognizing that the emperor's cause was lost.

== Ecclesiastical Affairs: The Georgian Monks and the Church of Iberia ==
A major recorded event of Theodosios's patriarchate involves his interactions with Saint George the Hagiorite regarding the Georgian monks at the Monastery of Saint Simeon Stylites the Younger and the broader Church of Georgian Iberia.Local monks near Antioch, resentful of the growing number of Georgian monks, accused them of heresy in an attempt to have them expelled. Theodosios summoned George the Hagiorite to examine the matter. Upon reviewing the Georgian faith, Theodosios officially approved its orthodoxy.

However, the accusers also challenged the legitimacy of the Iberian Church's hierarchy, arguing that it was irregular and that its catholicos should be ordained by the Patriarch of Antioch. Theodosios initially agreed, stating that a church not directly evangelized by the apostles should not ordain its own bishops. He instructed George the Hagiorite to use his influence with the King of Iberia to correct this. Theodosios went so far as to threaten that if the king refused, he would write to his "four patriarchal colleagues" to denounce the infraction of apostolic canons. Despite this strong initial stance, George the Hagiorite mounted such a compelling defense during a formal synodal session that Patriarch Theodosios ultimately renounced his demands and accepted the independence of the Iberian hierarchy.

== Stance on the Great Schism with Rome ==
Because Theodosios participated in the 1057 coup alongside Michael Cerularius (a primary architect of the 1054 Great Schism), there is circumstantial evidence that Theodosios may have supported Cerularius's anti-Roman religious policies. However, this interpretation is contradicted by Theodosios's own threat to write to his "four patriarchal colleagues" regarding the Iberian Church. By explicitly including the Bishop of Rome in the body of his patriarchal colleagues, Theodosios demonstrated that he did not consider Rome to be outside of ecclesiastical communion. Therefore, despite his political opportunism in the coup, there is evidence that he did not view himself as being in a state of schism with the West.
