= Kohlhammer Verlag =

German scientific publishing company

W. Kohlhammer Verlag GmbH
- Founded: 30 April 1866
- Founder: Wilhelm Kohlhammer
- Country of origin: Germany
- Headquarters location: Stuttgart
- Key people: Leopold Freiherr von und zu Weiler
- Revenue: €64.1 million
- No. of employees: 328
- Official website: www.kohlhammer.de

W. Kohlhammer Verlag GmbH, or Kohlhammer Verlag, is a German publishing house headquartered in Stuttgart.

== History ==
Kohlhammer Verlag was founded in Stuttgart on 30 April 1866 by Wilhelm Kohlhammer. Kohlhammer had taken over the businesses of his late father-in-law, a 120-year-old printer and a profitable bathhouse. The printing business, operating out of the back of a commercial building at 14 Urbanstrasse, became W. Kohlhammer Verlag and was funded by proceeds from the bathhouse until it was closed in 1890. Kohlhammer purchased the Deutsche Feuerwehrzeitung in 1882 and printed that publication until 1923. In 1872 Kohlhammer started a weekly newspaper, the Neue Deutsche Familienblatt that by 1914 had a circulation of 185,000.

=== Contemporary ===
Employees of Kohlhammer joined those of other Stuttgart-based companies in early 2016 to petition the mayor to abate traffic congestion hindering their operations inside the city.

In 2017, Kohlhammer Verlag employed about 400 people in Stuttgart, Würzburg and Augsburg. That year, the company opened a new office and subsidiary, Kohlhammer Druck, in Wangen im Allgäu.

In anticipation of the 2018 ban on diesel vehicles in Stuttgart, Kohlhammer ordered three smart vehicles with pure electric drive to service central Stuttgart.

It has a maintenance contract with Heidelberger Druckmaschinen AG, which supports its three Speedmaster XL 106 eight-color presses.

In 2019, it moved to a paper packaging system developed with Hugo Beck Maschinenbau GmbH, which is more environmentally friendly and durable than the foil previously used. The wrappers are individually printed on the company's inkjet roller, a Truepress Jet 520 HD, before packaging. This fits the growing public awareness of sustainability.

== Urban paperbacks ==
Kohlhammer Verlag's science program is its Urban paperbacks line, founded in 1953 by Fritz Ernst, making it the first scientific paperback serial in Germany. A well-known series in Germany, it covers subjects including history, psychology, education, theology, and philosophy.
