= Nicholas Baalbaki =

Greek Orthodox bishop

His Eminence Nicholas
- Metropolitan of Hama and Dependencies
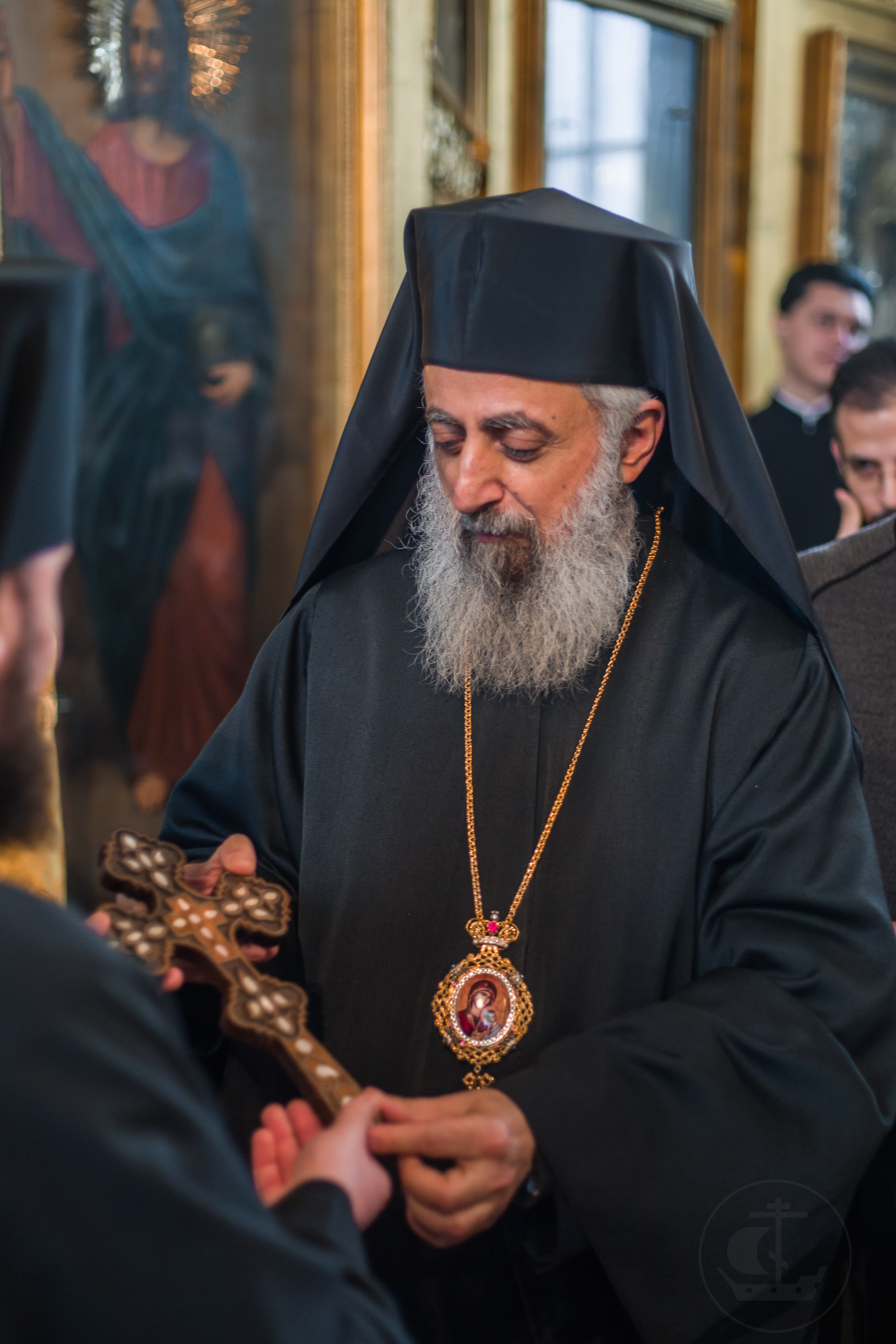
- Metropolitan Nicholas in 2019
- Archdiocese: Antioch
- See: Hama
- Elected: June 7, 2017
- Term ended: Incumbent
- Predecessor: Elia (Saliba)

Orders
- Ordination: 2011

Personal details
- Born: Ghassan Nqula Baalbaki; 1957 (age 68–69) Damascus, Syria
- Denomination: Greek Orthodox
- Education: University of Damascus; University of Balamand

Nicholas Baalbaki (Arabic: نقولا بعلبكي, romanized: niqula baelabakiy; born 1957) is the current Metropolitan of Hama and Dependencies of the Archdiocese of Antioch since 2017.

== Biography ==
Baalbaki was born as Ghassan Nqula Baalbaki in 1957 in Damascus. After graduating highschool, he enrolled at the University of Damascus and graduated with a doctorate with a specialty in surgery in 1984. In 1993 he enrolled at the University of Balamand, graduating from the school of Theology in 1998.

He was ordained as deacon on 8 November 1984, as a priest in 1985, and elevated to archimandrite in 1989. He was consecrated as a bishop in 2011 and was appointed a judge of the Primary Spiritual Court of the Archdiocese of Damascus in 2013.

In 2001 he was appointed to manage the Al-Hosn Patriarchal Hospital in Ain al-Ajouz.

== Bishop ==
On 7 June 2017 he was elected as the Metropolitan of Hama and dependencies by Patriarch John X, succeeding the previous bishop Elias Saliba. During his consecration, he emphasized that his role as a bishop "is as a servant and not as a master".

During his tenure as Metropolitan, Baalbaki has faced several challenged with persecution of the church in Syria. After the Syrian takeover, Baalbaki has made efforts of cooperation between the Christian community and the new government. On 17 February 2025, he met with a delegation of the Syriac Union Party to discuss the challenges faced in Syria and promote broader dialogue between the two communities. In 24 March, he held an Iftar banquit to promote unity between the Christian and Muslim communities of Syria.

Baalbaki has also worked in efforts to support the church outside of the civil war. In 2017 he presided over a banquet in Iași, Romania in honor of Saint Paraskeva of the Balkans. In 2020, he approved the construction of a replica of the Hagia Sophia with the aid of the Syrian government and Russia in protest of its reversion to a mosque that year. In 2023, he served as interim for the Archdiocese of Homs after the retirement of Metropolitan George Abu Zakhem.

== See also ==
- Sectarianism and minorities in the Syrian civil war

Eastern Orthodox Church titles
Preceded by Elia Saliba	Metropolitan of Hama; 2017–present	Succeeded by Incumbent
