= Orthodox Metropolitan Cathedral of São Paulo =

Antiochian Orthodox cathedral in São Paolo

Orthodox Cathedral of São Paulo
- Orthodox Metropolitan Cathedral of São Paulo
- Catedral Metropolitana Ortodoxa de São Paulo
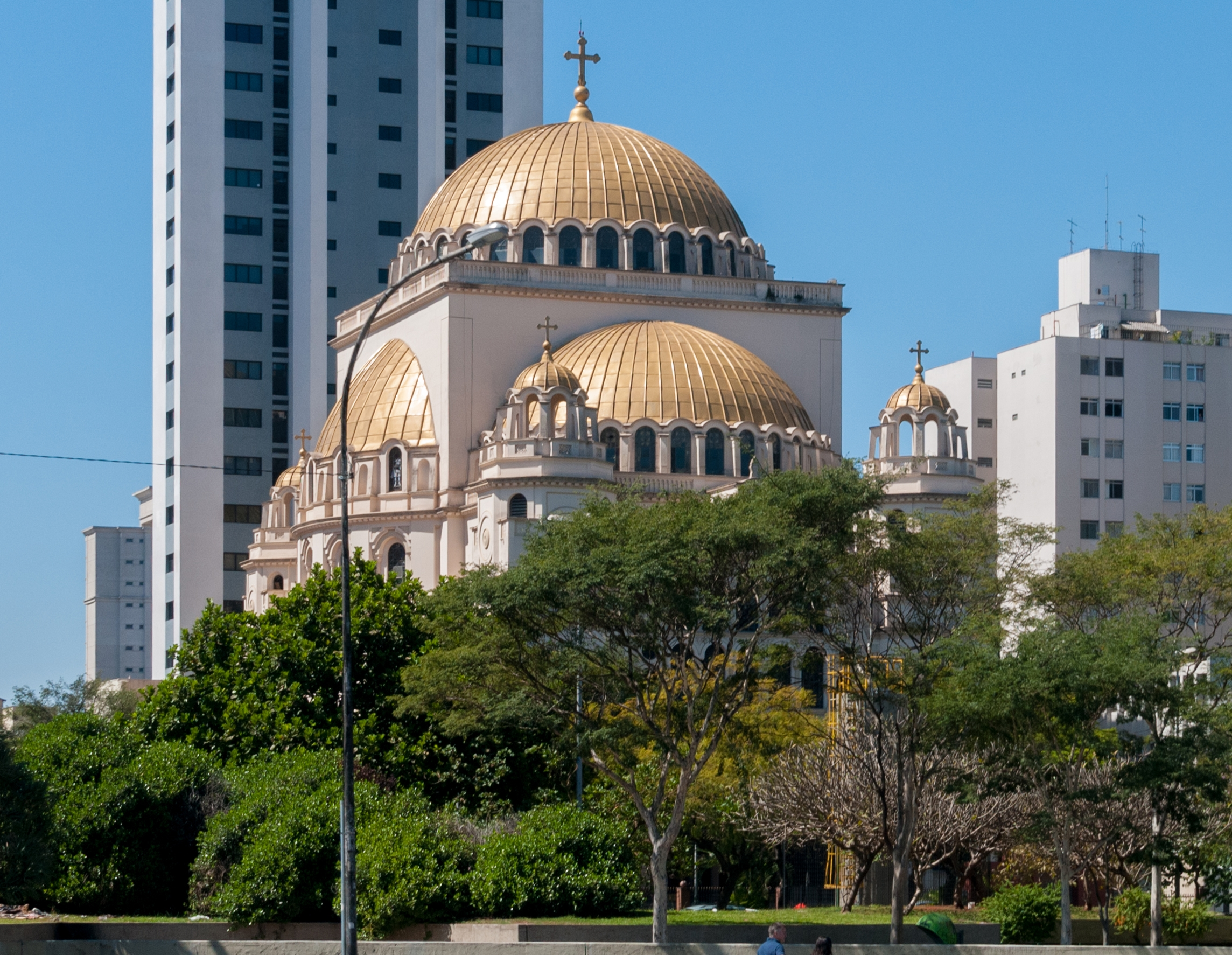
- Viewed from the west
- Orthodox Cathedral of São Paulo
- 23°34′32″S 46°38′25″W
- Location: Rua Vergeiro 1515; Paraíso; São Paulo; 04101-000
- Country: Brazil
- Denomination: Greek Orthodox
- Churchmanship: Greek Orthodox Church of Antioch
- Website: arquidioceseortodoxa.com.br

History
- Status: Cathedral
- Dedication: Paul the Apostle
- Consecrated: 1978

Architecture
- Functional status: Active
- Architects: Francisca Galvão Bueno; Igor Sresnewsky
- Architectural type: Cathedral church
- Style: Neo-Byzantine
- Groundbreaking: 1942
- Completed: January 1954

Administration
- Archdiocese: Antiochian Orthodox Archdiocese of São Paulo and All Brazil

Clergy
- Archbishop: The Most Rev. Metr. Damaskinos (Mansour)

The Orthodox Metropolitan Cathedral of São Paulo (Portuguese: Catedral Metropolitana Ortodoxa de São Paulo), also known as the Orthodox Cathedral of São Paulo, is a cathedral of the Greek Orthodox Church of Antioch, located at 1515 Vergueiro in Paraíso, Vila Mariana, São Paulo, Brazil.

Dedicated to Paul the Apostle, it is home to the Antiochian Orthodox Archdiocese of São Paulo and All Brazil. It was constructed to serve the many Syrian and Lebanese Brazilians of the Orthodox Christian faith who had been immigrating to Brazil since the late 19th century. It is one of the largest Eastern Orthodox cathedrals in the world, and a fine example of Byzantine Revival architecture.

== History ==
Construction of the cathedral began in 1942, inspired by the Hagia Sophia, and built under the supervision of Paul Taufick Camasmie with the architects Francisca Galvão Bueno and Igor Sresnewsky. Joseph Trabulsi was personally selected by King Farouk of Egypt to participate in its decoration. Wladimir Krivoutz worked on the cathedral's marble iconostasis.

The cathedral was inaugurated in January 1954, along with the celebrations of the quatercentenary of the city of São Paulo, and consecrated by Patriarch Elias IV and Metropolitan Ignátios Ferzli in 1978.

== See also ==
- Assembly of Canonical Orthodox Bishops of Latin America
