= Ephraim Kyriakos =

Metropolitan Archbishop of Tripoli

His Eminence Ephraim
- Metropolitan of Tripoli, Al-Koura, and Dependencies
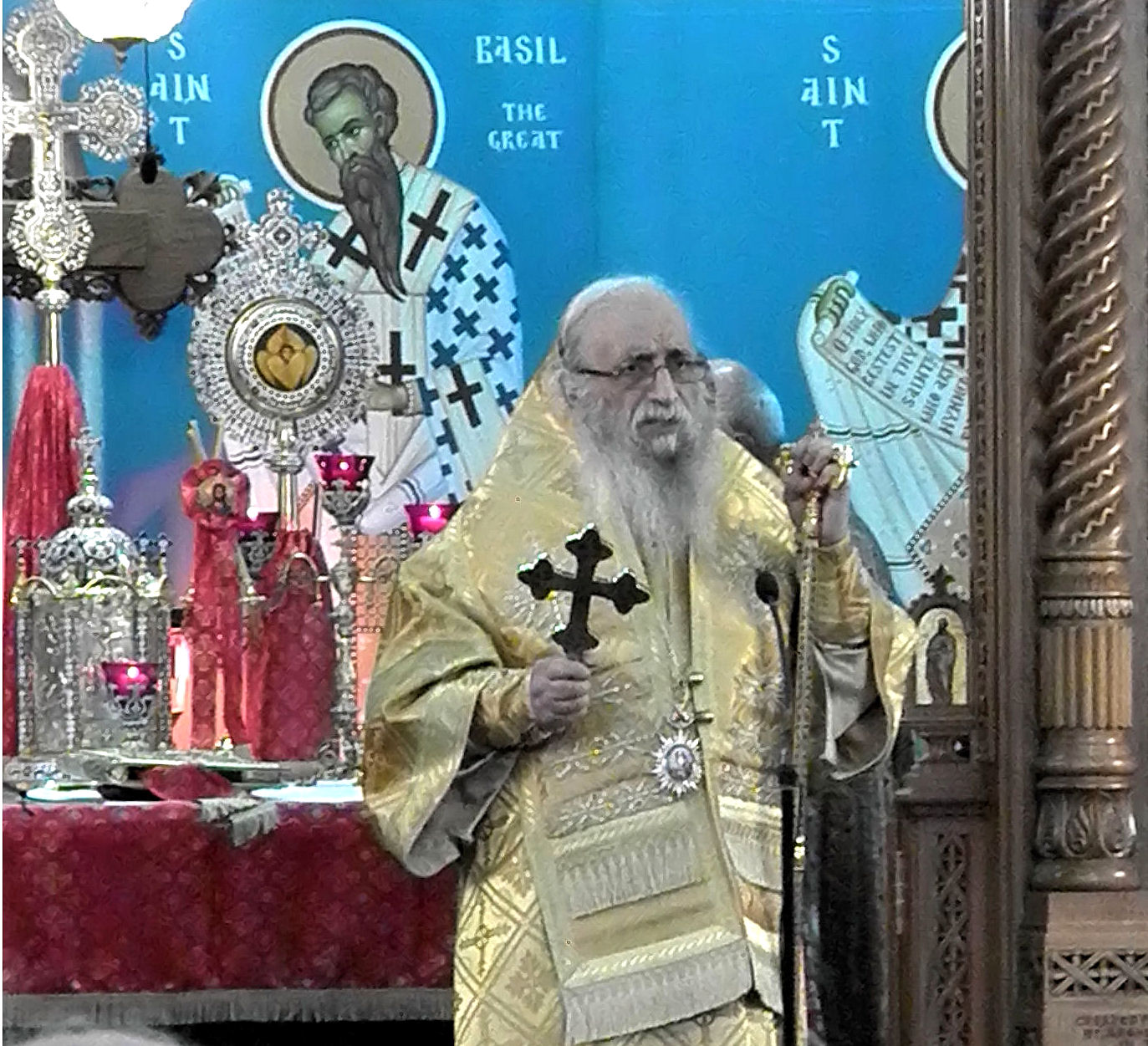
- Metropolitan Ephraim Kyriakos in 2014.
- Archdiocese: Antioch
- See: Tripoli, Lebanon
- Elected: October 6, 2009
- Term ended: Incumbent

Orders
- Ordination: 15 October 1978

Personal details
- Born: Michal Kyriakos; April 15, 1943 (age 83) Beirut, Lebanon
- Denomination: Greek Orthodox
- Education: Saint Joseph University of Beirut; University of Balamand

Metropolitan Ephraim (secular name Michel Kyriakos; born April 15, 1943) is the Metropolitan Archbishop of the Archdiocese of Tripoli, al-Koura and Dependencies of the Greek Orthodox Patriarchate of Antioch and All the East. He was the founder and abbot of the Holy Monastery of the Archangel Michael in Biq'aata, Lebanon

== Early life and education ==
Ephraim Kyriakos was born in Beirut, Lebanon on April 15, 1943, the son of Jamil Kyriakos and Alice Manassah. While living with his family in Achrafiyeh (East Beirut), he entered a career in telecommunications. He attended the International College in Beirut before joining the faculty of engineering of the Saint Joseph University of Beirut. He continued his studies in his specialty of electronics and communications in Paris, France before working in his field in the construction of a subway station.

He later pursued a teaching career, returning to St. Joseph University as a teacher. Later he continued teaching in Dekwaneh and at the National Orthodox High School (Mar-Elias)-al-Mina in Tripoli, Lebanon. He also led the Orthodox Youth Movement center in Beirut.

== Bishop ==
In 1972, Ephraim left his secular career and entered the St. John of Damascus Institute of Theology at the University of Balamand. The ongoing civil war in Lebanon in the 1970s caused, in 1975, the transfer of operations of the institute to the Theological Academy of Thessalonica in Greece. While attending the Institute, Ephraim entered holy orders when he was ordained a deacon on August 15, 1974. He was ordained a priest on October 15, 1978. After graduating, Patriarch Elias IV of Antioch asked Ephraim to return and reopen the Institute of Theology in Beirut; Ephraim served as its Dean from 1978 to 1981.

In Greece, Ephraim entered the monastic community when he was tonsured a monk at the Monastery of St. Paul on Mount Athos on October 16, 1983. At his tonsure, he received his name "Ephraim", in honor of Ephraim the Syrian, from the Elder Parthanios under whose spiritual direction Ephraim remained for several years.

After Ephraim returned to Lebanon, he established his own monastery in Nahr Baskinta, near Biq'aata, within the jurisdiction of Metropolitan George (Khodr) of Mount Lebanon. The name of the monastery is the Holy Archangel Michael Monastery.

Ephraim was elevated to archimandrite on November 8, 1991 by Metr. George (Khodr). At the invitation of Bp. Alexander of Ottawa, the Elder Ephraim made an extensive visit to Canada in the autumn of 2005.

On October 6, 2009, Arch. Ephraim (Kyriakos) was elected to be the Metropolitan Archbishop of Tripoli, Koura and Dependencies of the vacant Archdiocese of Tripoli, al-Koura and Dependencies after the repose of Abp. Elias (Kurban). On October 18, 2009 in the Marian Church Damascus he was elevated to archiepiscopacy and was received in Tripoli the following day in festivities at the Saint Georges Cathedral. Ephraim is fluent in Arabic, French, English, and Greek.

== Writings ==
Metr. Ephraim is the author of a number of books and articles. Among these are books about Ss. Gregory Palamas, John Climacus, Mary of Egypt, Jacob Brother of the Lord, Barbara, and others. His articles include Words from the Fathers, St. Ephraim the Syrian, and The Gospel of Mark as well as those in the periodical of the Monastery of St. Michael.
