= George Abu Zakhem =

Greek Orthodox bishop

His Eminence George
- Metropolitan of Homs and Dependencies
- Archdiocese: Antioch
- See: Homs
- Elected: 2000
- Term ended: 2023
- Successor: George (Khouri)

Orders
- Ordination: 1980
- Consecration: 1988

Personal details
- Born: George Abu Zakhem; 1949 (age 76–77) Arneh, Syria
- Denomination: Greek Orthodox
- Education: St. John of Damascus Institute; University of Thessaloniki

George Abu Zakhem (Arabic: جاورجيوس أبو زخم, romanized: jāūrjīūs 'abū zkhm; born 1949) is a Syrian bishop of the Greek Orthodox Patriarchate of Antioch. He was the metropolitan of Homs and Dependencies from 2000 to 2023.

== Early life and education ==
Abu Zakhem was born in Arneh, Syria in 1949. Before priesthood, he obtained a Bachelor of Theology from the St. John of Damascus Institute, and a Master of Theology from the University of Thessaloniki. He was ordained into priesthood in 1980 and served as the Dean of St. John of Damascus institute. He was consecrated as a bishop in 1988.

== Bishop ==
Abu Zakhem was elected Metropolitan of Homs in 1999, and enthroned in 2000. In 2010 he headed a meeting held by Patriarch Ignatius IV of Antioch which discussed the importance of connecting with the youth and commitment to the Orthodox Christian tradition.

During the Siege of Homs, all eleven churches in Hom's old city were heavily damaged or destroyed. Abu Zakhem accused rebel forces of lighting a church on fire. In September 15, 2022 he attended a ceremony to commemorate the Christians who have been killed in the war between 2011 and 2022.

In October 2023, Abu Zakhem retired. He was succeeded by George (Khouri).

== See also ==
- Church of Saint Elian
- Christians in Syria
- Arab Christians
- Sectarianism and minorities in the Syrian civil war

Eastern Orthodox Church titles
Preceded by ?	Metropolitan of Homs; 2000–2023	Succeeded by George (Khouri)
