= Elias IV of Antioch =

Greek Orthodox Patriarch

Elias IV Mouawwad إلياس الرابع معوض
- Greek Orthodox Patriarch of Antioch and All the East
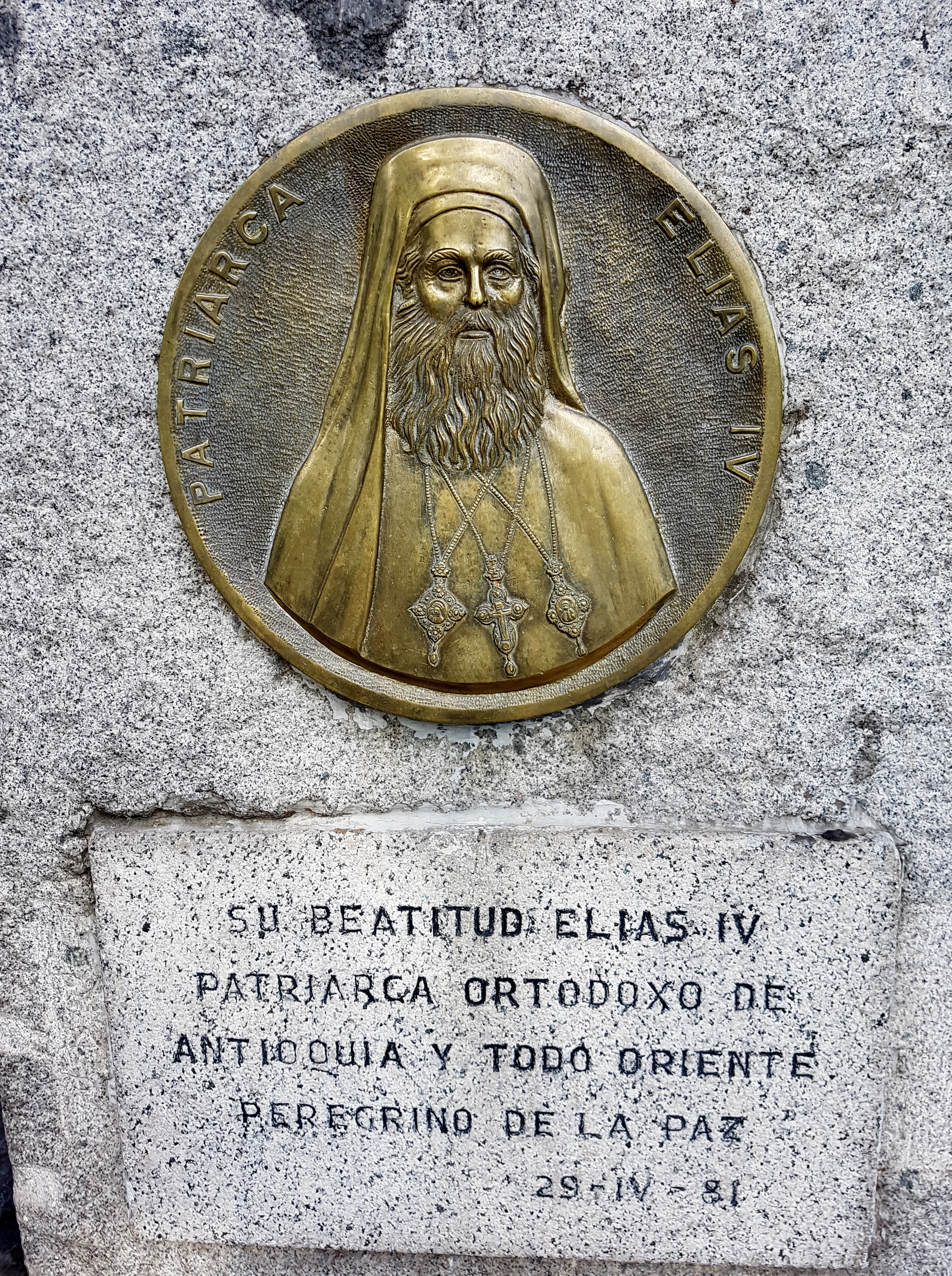
- Church: Greek Orthodox Church of Antioch
- Installed: 1970
- Term ended: 1979
- Predecessor: Theodosius VI of Antioch
- Successor: Ignatius IV of Antioch

Personal details
- Born: 1914 Ottoman Syria
- Died: June 21, 1979 (aged 64–65) Damascus, Syria

Patriarch Elias IV (Arabic: البطريرك إلياس الرابع al-Baṭriyark ʾIlyās ar-Rābiʿ; born ʾIlyās Muʿawwaḍ إلياس معوض; 1914 – June 21, 1979) was the Patriarch of the Greek Orthodox Church of Antioch and All the East from 1970 to 1979.

== Biography ==
Elias Mouawwad was born in 1914, in an Orthodox Christian family in modern-day Lebanon. He was ordained deacon in 1932, graduating from the Halki Theological School in 1939. In 1959, he was consecrated Metropolitan of Aleppo and Alexandretta, being elected Patriarch of Antioch on September 25, 1970, succeeding Theodosius VI only six days after his death.

Elias's pontificate was characterized by intense participation in Eastern Mediterranean politics, plus increased participation in the Arab diaspora, lines that would mark Middle Eastern Christian hierarchy henceforth. He emphatically referred to his faithful as "Arab Christians", a denomination that was then not as widespread. In February 1974, he took part in the Organisation of Islamic Cooperation 2nd Summit, in Lahore, being called on occasion by King Faisal of Saudi Arabia "Patriarch of the Arabs". In 1977, Patriarch Elias met President Jimmy Carter, being the first Patriarch of Antioch to ever visit the United States, and reiterated the necessity of independence for Palestinians. He consecrated with Metropolitan Ignátios Ferzli the Catedral Metropolitana Ortodoxa in São Paulo, Brazil, the following year. He died in Damascus on June 21, 1979, after suffering a heart attack.

Eastern Orthodox Church titles
| Preceded by Theodosius VI | Eastern Orthodox Patriarch of Antioch; 1970–1979 | Succeeded by Ignatius IV |
