= Joseph Al-Zehlaoui =

Syrian-American Antiochian Orthodox metropolitan

- Church: Greek Orthodox Church of Antioch
- Archdiocese: Antiochian Orthodox Christian Archdiocese of North America
- Elected: July 3, 2014
- Retired: September 17, 2022
- Predecessor: Philip
- Successor: Saba
- Other posts: Bishop of Qatana (1991–2004); Bishop of Los Angeles (2004–2014)

Orders
- Ordination: 1976 (deacon); 1980 (priest)
- Consecration: June 30, 1991
- Laicized: March 14, 2024

Personal details
- Born: November 2, 1948 (age 77) Damascus, Syria
- Denomination: Eastern Orthodox
- Education: Lebanese University; Salonika University

Joseph Al-Zehlaoui (born on November 2, 1948) is a defrocked former bishop of the Greek Orthodox Patriarchate of Antioch and was the Metropolitan of the Antiochian Orthodox Christian Archdiocese of North America from July 3, 2014, until his retirement on September 17, 2022, and subsequent defrocking.

In October 2023, Al-Zehlaoui sued the archdiocese for millions of dollars, alleging promises by Archdiocesan officials which were not allegedly fulfilled. On March 14, 2024, in response to the lawsuit and for refusal to vacate the Los Angeles chancery belonging to the archdiocese, he was defrocked by the Holy Synod of Antioch.

== Early years ==
Joseph G. Al-Zehlaoui or Joseph Zehlaoui (in Arabic جوزيف زحلاوي) was born on November 2, 1948, in Damascus, Syria to Georgi and Mathil (Baghdan) Al-Zehlaoui. After receiving his elementary education at the St. John of Damascus and Al-Assiyeh schools in Damascus, and his secondary education at Balamand Monastery in Koura, Northern Lebanon, he studied philosophy at Lebanese University in Beirut and theology, languages and music at the Aristotle University of Thessaloniki in Greece. He is fluent in Arabic, English, and Greek.

He was ordained to the diaconate while a student in Salonica, in December 1976. Subsequently, he was ordained to the priesthood by Patriarch Ignatius IV, at St. Mary Cathedral in Damascus in December, 1980. As a deacon, he served parishes in Thessaloniki. As a priest, he was dean of St. Mary Cathedral of Damascus, and overseer of the Holy Cross Church and other parishes in the suburbs of Damascus. In 1983, he pastored the Antiochian Orthodox followers living in London, England, and, in 1986, the Antiochian Orthodox community living in Cyprus.

He was elected to the episcopate on May 5, 1991, and consecrated on June 30, 1991, in the Holy Cathedral of the Patriarchate in Damascus with the title Bishop of Katana, Syria.

During his clerical ministry, he served as General Supervisor and Professor of Religious Education at the Al-Assiyeh Orthodox College and supervised the Patriarchal headquarters in Damascus. Besides being the Patriarchal Assistant during the past several years, Bishop Joseph served as the secretary to the Holy Synod of Antioch, Editor-in-Chief of the Patriarchal Bulletin and participated in several theological conferences in Greece, Texas, US, and Australia.

== Service in the United States ==
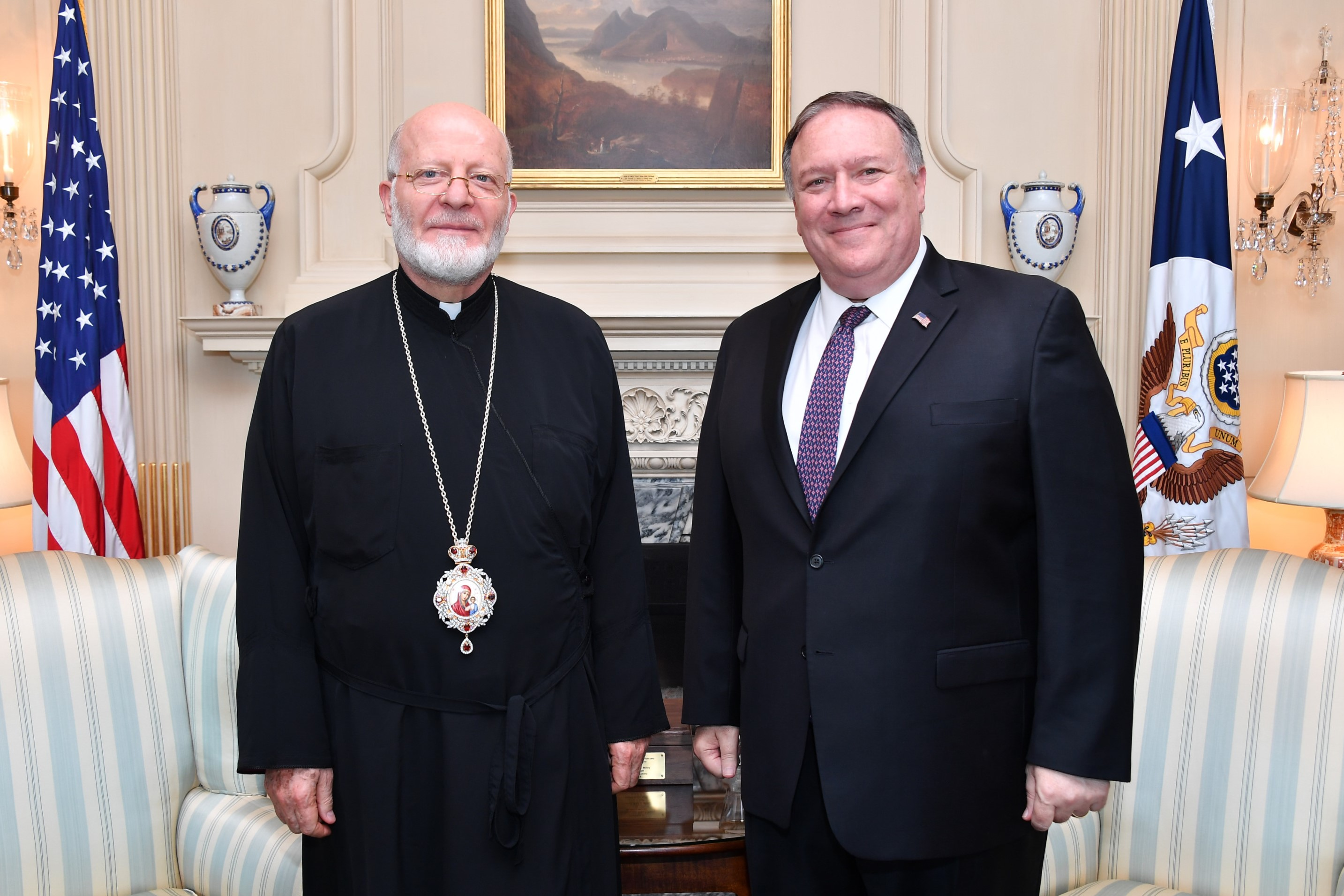
Al Zehlaoui and Mike Pompeo in July 2019

At the request of Metropolitan Philip (Saliba) of New York, Al-Zehlaoui was selected by the Holy Synod of Antioch on January 24, 1995, to be an auxiliary bishop for the Antiochian Orthodox Christian Archdiocese of North America.

Starting September 12, 2004, he was appointed as the first bishop of the Holy Diocese of Los Angeles and the West, enthroned by Metropolitan Philip and the Local Holy Synod of the Archdiocese.

Following the death of Antiochian Orthodox Metropolitan Philip Saliba (1966–March 19, 2014), the Holy Synod of the Greek Orthodox Patriarchate of Antioch and All the East convened on July 3, 2014, at the Our Lady of Balamand Patriarchal Monastery in Northern Lebanon and elected Al-Zehlaoui at its meeting as metropolitan of North America.

Al-Zehlaoui's former title was His Eminence, the Most Reverend Joseph, Archbishop of New York and Metropolitan of All North America, Primate.

== End of episcopacy and defrocking ==
Al-Zehlaoui resigned from the episcopacy on September 7, 2022, in the face of allegations of sexual impropriety with a woman. However, in late 2023, Al-Zehlaoudi filed a summons against the Antiochian Orthodox Christian Archdiocese of North America, alleging that the leak and publication of incriminating emails was slanderous and that several verbal promises about retirement funding had been neglected and broken by the archdiocese. Following the filing of this lawsuit, Al-Zehlaoui was defrocked, returning him to the laity (as opposed to being a retired bishop), due to "improper actions as clergyman (retired Metropolitan) with respect to church property and monetary matters, and initiating a legal proceeding against the Church in a civil court".

Eastern Orthodox Church titles
Preceded by Philip Saliba	Archbishop of New York and All America (Antiochian); 2014 – 2022	Succeeded by Saba Esber
