= Saba Esber =

Eastern Orthodox archbishop

His Eminence Saba
- Metropolitan of the Antiochian Orthodox Christian Archdiocese of North America and Archbishop of New York
- Native name: سابا إسبر
- Elected: 23 February 2023
- Predecessor: Joseph
- Other posts: Archbishop of Bosra, Hauran and Jabal Al-Arab

Orders
- Ordination: 1988
- Consecration: 1998

Personal details
- Born: Saba Esper; 1959 (age 66–67) Latakia, Latakia Governorate, Syria
- Denomination: Antiochian Orthodox
- Occupation: Author, Clergyman
- Education: Tishreen University (BA – Civil Engineering); University of Balamand (BA – Theology)

Metropolitan Saba Esper (also spelled Isper) (Arabic: سابا (إسبر), born 1959) is the Antiochian Orthodox Metropolitan over the Archdiocese of New York and All North America, formerly the metropolitan archbishop of Bosra, Hauran and Jabal al-Arab in Syria.

== Biography ==
Saba Esber was born in 1959 in Latakia, Syria, to an Orthodox Christian family. He graduated in 1987 with a BA in Civil Engineering from Tishreen University in Latakia and with a BTh in Theology from the University of Balamand.

He was ordained to the diaconate in 29 November 1984 and the priesthood in 1988, serving at the Church of the Archangel Michael in Latakia. In 1994 he was elevated to the rank of archimandrite. He was elected as an auxiliary bishop to Patriarch Ignatius IV of Antioch and consecrated to the episcopacy and assigned as an auxiliary in Latakia where he pastored until 1998. In 1999, he was elected by the Holy Synod of Antioch to be the Metropolitan of Bosra and Hauran.

His episcopacy has been in the midst of extremely difficult circumstances, as the region over which he has presided has been particularly badly damaged and materially impoverished by the Syrian civil war.

On February 23, 2023, the Holy Synod of Antioch elected Metropolitan Saba to be the Metropolitan of the Antiochian Orthodox Christian Archdiocese of North America.

He has translated numerous books and articles into Arabic, as well as serving as author and editor of many other articles.

From 1995 to 2006, he taught Pastoral Care and Introduction to the Old Testament at the Saint John of Damascus Institute of Theology at the University of Balamand.

As part of his friendship with Bishop Basil (Essey) of the Antiochian Orthodox Christian Archdiocese of North America, Saba has overseen a program of "twinning" between parishes of the North American archdiocese and his own archdiocese of Hauran as part of a "sister diocese" relationship.

In 2022, his name was included among those on the nominating ballot for consideration for election by the Holy Synod of Antioch to be the metropolitan archbishop of the Antiochian Orthodox Christian Archdiocese of North America. He was elected metropolitan of the archdiocese in 23 February 2023.

== See also ==
- Greek Orthodox Patriarchate of Antioch
- Antiochian Orthodox Christian Archdiocese of North America
- Antiochian Greek Christians

Eastern Orthodox Church titles
Preceded by Joseph Al-Zehlaoui	Archbishop of New York and All America (Antiochian); 2023 – Present	Succeeded by Incumbent
