= Theodosius VI of Antioch =

Theodosius VI Abou Rjaileh
- Greek Orthodox Patriarch of Antioch and All the East
- Native name: ثاودوسيوس السادس أبو رجيلة
- Church: Greek Orthodox Church of Antioch
- Installed: 1958
- Term ended: 1970
- Predecessor: Alexander III of Antioch
- Successor: Elias IV of Antioch

Personal details
- Born: Spyridon Abou Rjaileh; 1885
- Died: 1970 (aged 84–85)

Patriarch Theodosius VI (Arabic: البطريرك ثاودوسيوس السادس al-Baṭriyark Ṯāwudūsiyūs as-Sādis; born Sbīrīdūn ʾAbū Rujayla سبيريدون أبو رجيلة; 1885–1970) was Greek Orthodox Patriarch of Antioch from 1958 to 1970.

== Life ==
Spyridon Abou Rjaileh was born in Karssoun, Mount Lebanon in 1885, after which his family moved to Ashrafieh in East Beirut. He had five siblings, two sisters and three brothers. Spyridon received his early education in Ashrafieh. He then attended the Ecole des Trois Docteurs in Beirut, followed by studies at the Kasibiya school in Damascus, Syria. Then, he joined the theological school that was resident at the Balamand Monastery near Tripoli in north Lebanon.

In 1906, Spyridon was ordained subdeacon by Patriarch Gregory IV of Antioch. In 1908, he was transferred to the Archdiocese of Diyar Bak in northern Iraq to learn the Turkish language. He returned in 1912. Later, he was sent to Constantinople to learn the Greek language. In addition, Spyridon was also to become fluent in Arabic and French with a working knowledge of English and Russian.

In 1914, Theodosius was appointed a liaison officer between the Antiochian patriarchate and the Turkish government serving the Orthodox Christian communities in Syria and Lebanon. The following year, 1915, he was ordained a priest and subsequently was elevated to the dignity of archimandrite by the Patr. Gregory IV to whom Archim. Theodosius became an aide and became known as the "Translator".

In 1923, Fr. Theodosius was elected Metropolitan Archbishop of Tyre and Sidon in south Lebanon, a position he held for 25 years. In 1948, Metr. Theodosius was appointed by the Holy Synod of the Church of Antioch to lead the Archdiocese of Tripoli.

During 1935, Metr. Theodosius guided the election of a new archbishop for the Syrian Orthodox in North America that resulted in the consecration of Antony Bashir.

On November 14, 1958, Metr. Theodosius was elected Patriarch of Antioch as Theodosius VI, succeeding Patr. Alexander III of Antioch, after having served as locum tenens following Patr. Alexander's death on June 17, 1958.

On September 19, 1970, Patr. Theodosius reposed in Saint Georges Hospital in Ashrafieh, Beirut.

== Sequence ==
Preceded by Alexander III of Antioch	Eastern Orthodox Patriarch of Antioch; 1958–1970	Succeeded by Elias IV of Antioch

== Literature ==
- Hage, Wolfgang (2007). Das orientalische Christentum (in German). Stuttgart: Kohlhammer Verlag. ISBN 9783170176683.
