= Metropolitan Joseph =

Metropolitan Joseph may refer to:

- Metropolitan Joseph (Petrovykh), Metropolitan of Leningrad in 1926–1927
- Joseph Al-Zehlaoui, Metropolitan of the Antiochian Orthodox Christian Archdiocese of North America since 2014
