= Alexander III of Antioch =

Greek religious leader (1869–1958)

Alexander III Tahhan ألكسندروس الثالث طحان
- Greek Orthodox Patriarch of Antioch and All the East
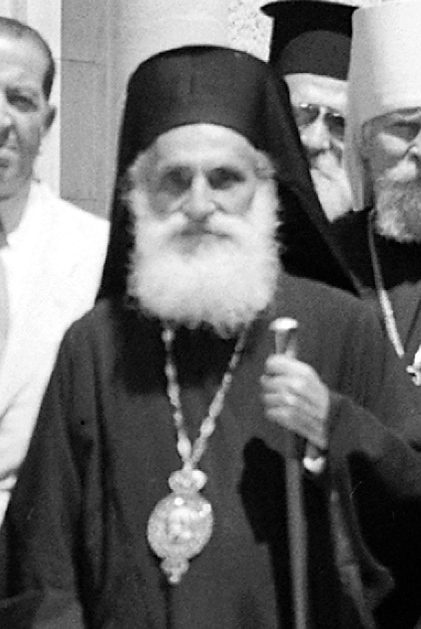
- Church: Greek Orthodox Church of Antioch
- Installed: 1928
- Term ended: 1958
- Predecessor: Gregory IV of Antioch
- Successor: Theodosius VI of Antioch

Personal details
- Born: 1869 Damascus, Ottoman Syria
- Died: 17 June 1958 (aged 88–89) Damascus, Syria

Patriarch Alexander III Tahhan (Arabic: البطريرك ألكسندروس الثالث طحان al-Baṭriyark ʾAliksandrūs aṯ-Ṯāliṯ Ṭaḥḥān; 1869–1958) was Greek Orthodox Patriarch of Antioch and all the East from 1928 to 1958. He was instrumental in the revival of churches and monasteries within the patriarchate. He also moved for the revival of the Patriarchal Theological School at Balamand.

Alexander, after consultations with the hierarchs of the other autocephalous churches, on May 31, 1958, authorized Metropolitan Antony Bashir to establish the Western Rite in the Antiochian Archdiocese in the United States.

He died on 17 June 1958.

== Literature ==
- Hage, Wolfgang (2007). Das orientalische Christentum. Stuttgart: Kohlhammer Verlag. ISBN 9783170176683.

Preceded by Gregory IV of Antioch	Eastern Orthodox Patriarch of Antioch; 1931–1958	Succeeded by Theodosius VI of Antioch
