= Greek Orthodox Archdiocese of Hama =

Archdiocese of the Antioch Orthodox Church

Archdiocese of Hama
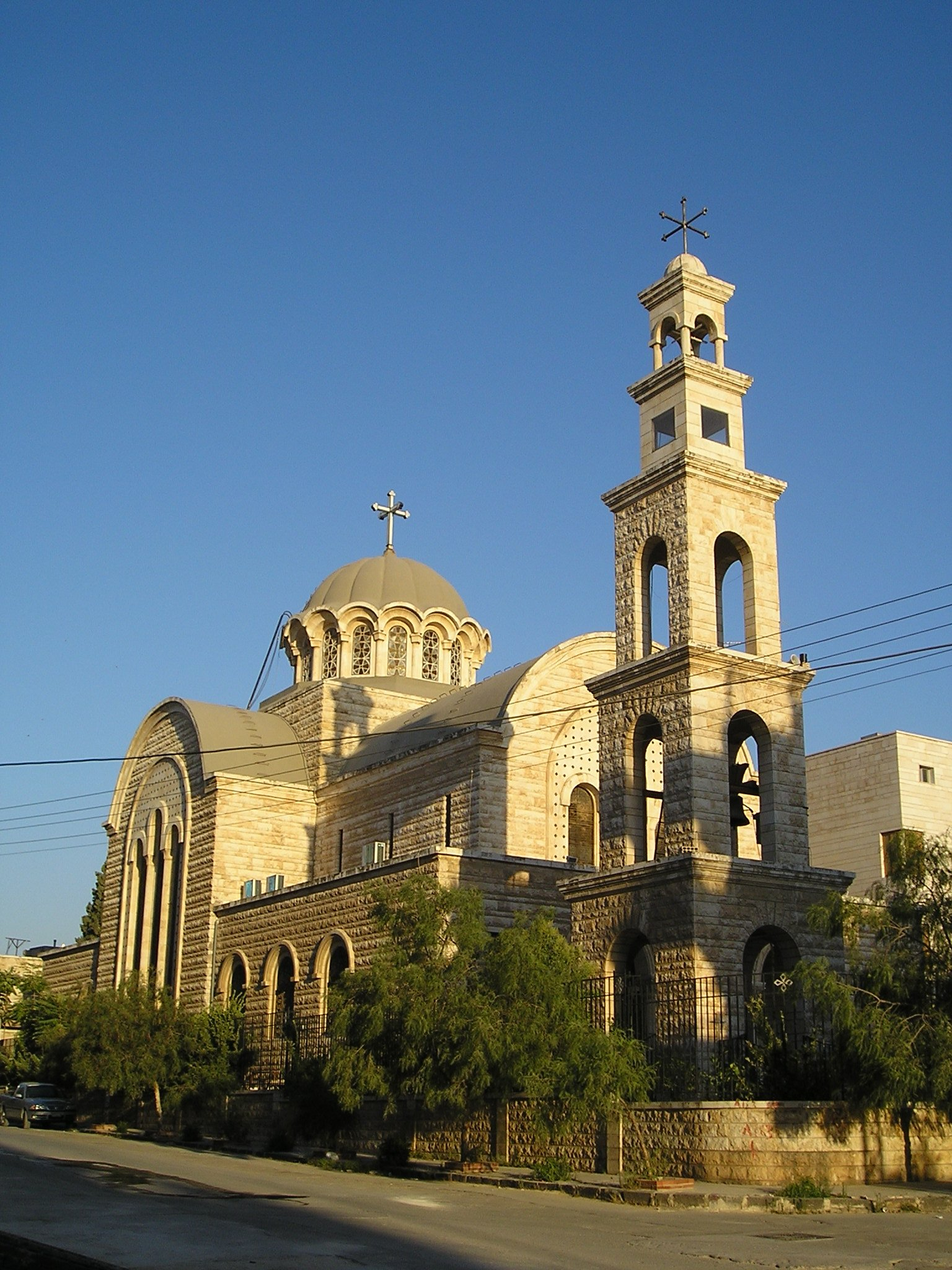
- Saint George's Cathedral in Hama

Location
- Country: Syria
- Territory: Syria
- Headquarters: Hama, Syria

Information
- Language: Greek, Arabic, English

Current leadership
- Patriarch: Patriarch of Antioch John X
- Metropolitan: Nicholas (Baalbaki)

The Archdiocese of Hama (Arabic: أبرشية حماة, romanized: abrashiat hamaa) is an archdiocese of the Antiochian Orthodox Church. It has been headed by Metropolitan Nicholas (Baalbaki) since 2017.

== Syrian Civil War ==
During the Syrian Civil War, Hama saw intense fighting between the government forces and anti-government forces in 2011 and against the Islamic State in 2014. In 2024, it was captured by rebels on 28 November 2024.

Since the rebel take over, Hama has experienced repeated targeted attacks by Islamic groups, including extra-judicial killings and attacks on homes and private property. In December 2024, a faction of Hay'at Tahrir al-Sham, later identified as Ansar al-Tawhid, vandalized a church in Hama. On 18 December, 2024 an unidentified group attacked and opened fire on another church. On 24 December that same year, Ansar al-Tawhid set fire to a Christmas tree during Christmas celebrations, prompting hundreds to protest in Syria.

== See also ==
- Christian Arabs
- Christianity in Syria
- Sectarianism and minorities in the Syrian civil war
