= Greek Orthodox Archdiocese of Zahleh and Baalbek =

Archdiocese of the Antioch Orthodox Church

Archdiocese of Zahleh, Baalbek and Dependencies

Location
- Country: Lebanon
- Territory: Lebanon, Syria
- Headquarters: Zahlé, Lebanon

Information
- Established: c. 6th century
- Language: Greek, Arabic, English

Current leadership
- Patriarch: Patriarch of Antioch John X
- Metropolitan: Antonios (El Soury)

Website
- https://archzahle.com/

The Archdiocese of Zahleh, Baalbek and Dependencies (Arabic: مطرانية زحلة وبعلبك وتوابعهما للروم الأرثوذكس, romanized: mṭrāny zḥl wbʿlbk wtwābʿhmā llrwm ālrṯwḏks) is an archdiocese of the Antiochian Orthodox Church. It has been headed by Metropolitan Antonios (El Soury) since 2015.

== History ==
The diocese was created from the diocese of Damascus in the 6th century. In the 15th century the bishoprics of Saidnaya, Zabadani, Yabroud, and Qara were added to the diocese. Sometime in the 18th century the city of Tadmur was also mentioned as being a part of the diocese.

In the middle of the 19th century, the modern day diocese was formed then known as the Diocese of Silfikias. It included the Qalamoun Mountains, Wadi Barada, and Wadi al-Bekaa, with its center in the city of Zahle. On August 30, 1929, the diocese was renamed to the Archdiocese of Zahleh, Baalbek and Dependencies to reflect its modern name.

== Bishops ==
- Methodius (Saliba) 1854–1888
- Gerasimos (Yard) 1889–1899
- Germanos (Shehadeh) 1904–1925
- Nevin (Saba) 1925 - 1966
- Spyridon (Khoury) 1966 - 2015
- Antonios (El Soury) 2015–present

== See also ==
- Christian Arabs
- Greeks in Lebanon
- Christianity in Lebanon
