= Greek Orthodox Archdiocese of Homs =

Archdiocese of the Antioch Orthodox Church

Archdiocese of Homs

Location
- Country: Syria
- Territory: Syria
- Headquarters: Homs, Syria

Information
- Language: Greek, Arabic, English

Current leadership
- Patriarch: Patriarch of Antioch John X
- Metropolitan: George (Khoury)

The Archdiocese of Homs (Arabic: أبرشية حمص للروم الأرثوذكس, romanized: 'abrashiat hims lilruwm al'urthudhuks) is an archdiocese of the Antiochian Orthodox Church. It has been headed by Metropolitan George (Khoury) since 2023.

== Bishops ==
- George (Abu Zakhem) 2000 - 2023
- George (Khoury) 2023 - present

== See also ==
- Christian Arabs
- Christianity in Syria
- Church of Saint Elian
