= Ignatius Firzli =

Dom Ignatios Firzli (April 25, 1913 – August 10, 1997), also known in Brazil as Ignatios Ferzli, was a Melkite Greek Orthodox Christian priest and theologian who became Antiochian Metropolitan Bishop of São Paulo and head of the Greek Orthodox Church of Antioch for Brazil and South America.

He is also known as Father Ignatios of São Paulo in the Melkite Greek Orthodox Church of Antioch.

== Life ==
Father Ignatios (or Ignatius) was born in Zahleh, Ottoman Syria (now Lebanon), on April 25, 1913. After graduating from the Byzantine Antiochian Patriarchal School of Theology of Damascus, he was ordained into the Greek Orthodox priesthood in 1933 for the Diocese of Alexandria, Kingdom of Egypt, then an autonomous part of the British Empire. He furthered his study of Byzantine Christian theology at the Patriarchical Halki seminary in Istanbul, Turkey, alongside his longtime friend father Parthenios Koinidis, who later became head of the Greek Orthodox Church of Egypt, Sudan and Africa under the name of Parthenius III of Alexandria.

Father Ignatios graduated in 1939, at the start of the Second World War, and chose to return to Egypt, where he was raised to the rank of Grand Archimandrite ('Senior Superior Abbott') of the Greek Patriarchate of Alexandria and All Africa.

He was then appointed Metropolitan Bishop of São Paulo for the Greek Orthodox Church of Antioch, thus becoming the de facto head of the Syro-Lebanese Greek Orthodox diasporas of Brazil and South America. He famously said: “Everything went so that I would serve Orthodoxy on the throne of St. Mark [the Greek Church of Egypt, Sudan and Africa], when, to my great surprise, I was assigned to serve on the throne of St. Paul [the Greek Church of Southern Turkey, Syria, Lebanon and Northeastern Israel], and, all of a sudden, my personal mission was ‘diverted’ to Brazil".

== Legacy ==
Dom Ignatios served as spiritual leader of the Syro-Lebanese Byzantine Christian communities of Brazil and South America throughout most of the Cold War, a particularly tense period characterized by social and political upheavals in Latin America.

He is remembered as a polyglot and polymath who could "speak and write fluently English, Russian, Portuguese, Spanish, French, Modern Greek, Classical Arabic, Turkish and Armenian".

His personal assistant and sexton (or Shammes in Ancient Hebrew and Levantine Arabic) who served for many years under Dom Ignatios at the Syro-Lebanese Greek-Orthodox Central Church of São Paulo (known as 'Da Igreja Ortodoxa da Rua Vergueiro') was Father Habib Haddad ('Cury Habib'), paternal grandfather of Fernando Haddad, the mayor of São Paulo.

== See also ==
- Greek Orthodox Church of Antioch
