= Greek Orthodox Archdiocese of Byblos and Batroun =

The Greek Orthodox Archdiocese of Byblos and Batroun is an archdiocese part of the Syrian-based patriarchate of the Eastern Orthodox Church of Antioch.

== List of Archbishops ==
- Paul Abou Adal (1901–1929)
- Elyia Karam (1935–1969)
- George Khodr (1970–2018)
- Silouan Moussi (2018–present)
