= Ignatius IV of Antioch =

20th and 21st-century Patriarch of Antioch

Ignatius IV Hazim إغناطيوس الرابع هزيم
- Greek Orthodox Patriarch of Antioch and All the East
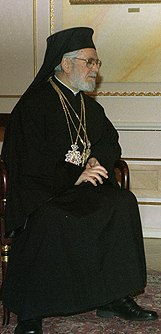
- Church: Greek Orthodox Church of Antioch
- See: Antioch
- Installed: July 2, 1979
- Term ended: December 5, 2012
- Predecessor: Elias IV
- Successor: John X
- Previous posts: Bishop of Palmyra (1961-1970); Metropolitan of Latakia (1970-1979)

Orders
- Ordination: 1953
- Consecration: 1961

Personal details
- Born: Habib Hazim; April 17, 1920 Mhardeh, Arab Kingdom of Syria (present-day Hama Governorate, Syria)
- Died: December 5, 2012 (aged 92) Beirut, Lebanon
- Residence: Mariamite Cathedral of Damascus, Street Called Straight, Damascus, Syria
- Education: St. Sergius Orthodox Theological Institute of Paris, France

Patriarch Ignatius IV (Arabic: البطريرك إغناطيوس الرابع al-Baṭriyark ʾIġnāṭiyūs ar-Rābiʿ; born Ḥabīb Hazīm حبيب هزيم; April 17, 1920 – December 5, 2012) was the Patriarch of the Greek Orthodox Church of Antioch and All The East from 1979 to 2012.

== Life ==
Habib Hazim was born on April 4, 1920, in the village of Mhardeh near Hama in Syria. He was the son of a pious Greek Orthodox Syrian Arab Christian family and from an early age was attracted to service within the Church. While studying in Beirut, Lebanon, for a literature degree, he entered the service of the local Antiochian Orthodox diocese, first by becoming an acolyte, then a subdeacon and then a deacon. During his studies at the American University of Beirut, young Habib was influenced by his outstanding philosophy professor Charles Malik. Malik influenced his students tremendously on matters of philosophy and spirituality — many of whom (i.e. many of Hazim's classmates) became ordained ministers and friars in various ecclesiastical orders under Malik's influence. In 1945 he went to Paris where he graduated from the St. Sergius Orthodox Theological Institute. From his time in France onwards he was moved not only by a desire to pass on the deposit of the Greek Orthodox faith, but also to take Orthodoxy out of its unhistorical ghetto by discovering in its Holy Tradition living answers to the problems of modern life. On his return to the Eastern Mediterranean, he founded the University of Balamand in Lebanon which he then served for many years as dean. As Dean he sought to provide the Patriarchate with responsible leaders who had received a good spiritual and intellectual training and who were witnesses to an awakened and deeply personal faith.

While his native language was Arabic, he also spoke fluent English and French. He was one of the founders of the active Orthodox Youth Movement of Lebanon and Syria in 1942, through which he helped to organise and lead a renewal of Church life in the Patriarchate of Antioch. The movement worked at the heart of the Church, helping ordinary believers to rediscover the personal and communal meaning of the Eucharist through a practice of frequent Communion, which had become extremely rare. Following on from this, in 1953 he helped to found Syndesmos, the world fellowship of Orthodox Youth and Theological Schools.

== Ordination and episcopacy ==
He was consecrated to episcopacy in 1961 as titular Bishop of Palamyra. Later he was elected Metropolitan of Latakia in 1970. His style as metropolitan broke with the former tradition of episcopal grandeur and he inaugurated an authentic practice of frequent communion. On July 2, 1979, under the name of Ignatius IV, he became the Orthodox Patriarch of Antioch, the third ranking hierarch of the Eastern Orthodox Church after the Ecumenical Patriarchs of Constantinople and Alexandria.

During an official visit to the patriarch's residence in May 2010, Russian Federation President Dmitry Medvedev awarded the Antiochian Orthodox patriarch the Russian Order of Friendship.

On December 5, 2012 he died in St. George's Hospital in Beirut, Lebanon following a stroke. His death was reported to and published exclusively via the Syrian state news agency SANA. Patriarch Ignatius IV of Antioch did not support the Syrian rebel uprising of 2011-2012 and called for a peaceful political dialogue. He was buried in Syria.

Eastern Orthodox Church titles
Preceded by Elias IV Muawad	Eastern Orthodox Patriarch of Antioch; 1979–2012	Succeeded by John X Yaziji
