= Greek Orthodox Patriarchate of Antioch =

Eastern Orthodox patriarchate currently headquartered in Damascus, Syria

Greek Orthodox Patriarchate of Antioch and All the East
- بطريركيّة أنطاكية وسائر المشرق للروم الأرثوذكس (Arabic)
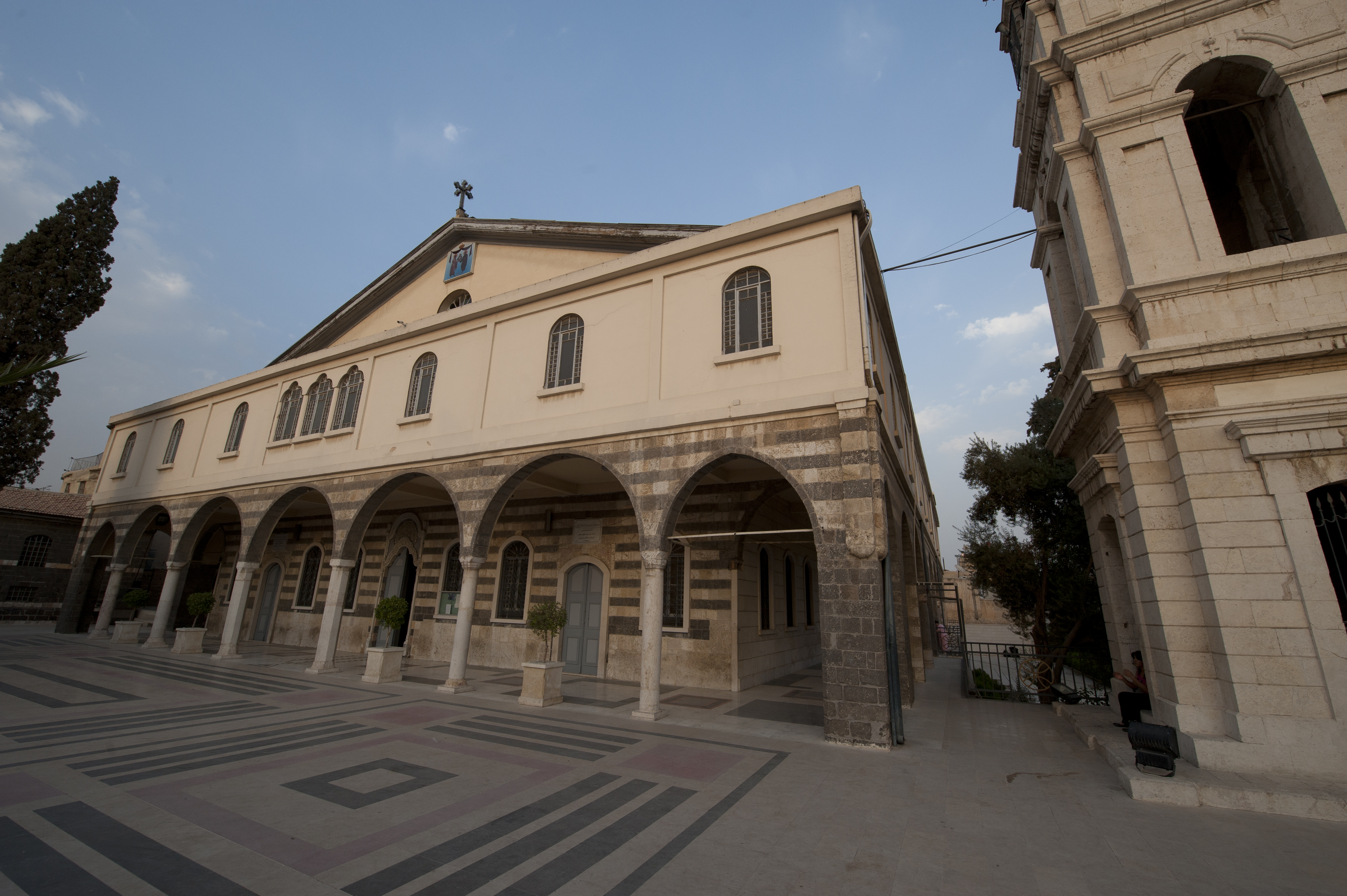
- Mariamite Cathedral, Damascus, Syria, headquarters of the Greek Orthodox Church of Antioch since 1342
- Type: Autocephaly
- Classification: Christian
- Orientation: Eastern Orthodox
- Scripture: Septuagint; New Testament
- Theology: Eastern Orthodox theology
- Polity: Episcopal
- Primate: John X (Yazigi), Patriarch of Antioch and All the East (since December 17, 2012)
- Language: Koine Greek (historical); Aramaic (Classical Syriac) (historical); Arabic (official) (Note: All metropolitans are now required to be proficient in Arabic, per the Church's statutes.); Turkish (in Turkey); English, French, Portuguese, Spanish and other languages (extended)
- Liturgy: Byzantine Rite (predominant); Western Rite
- Headquarters: Mariamite Cathedral, Damascus, Syria; Traditionally: Church of Cassian, Antioch, Byzantine Empire; Monastic residence: Balamand Monastery, Koura, Lebanon
- Territory: Primary: Syria, Lebanon, part of Turkey, Iraq, Iran, Kuwait, Bahrain, Qatar, UAE, Oman, Yemen, Saudi Arabia (formerly also Cyprus, Georgia and parts of the Central Caucasus area); Extended: North America, Central America, South America, Western, Southern and Central Europe, Australia, New Zealand, Philippines
- Founder: Apostles Peter and Paul
- Origin: 1st century Antioch, Roman Empire
- Branched from: Church of Antioch (following the Council of Chalcedon in 451)
- Separations: several, see list below
- Members: 4,320,000
- Official website: www.antiochpatriarchate.org

The Greek Orthodox Patriarchate of Antioch (Greek: Ελληνορθόδοξο Πατριαρχείο Αντιοχείας), also known as the Greek Orthodox Church of Antioch, Antiochian Orthodox Church and legally as the Rūm Orthodox Patriarchate of Antioch and All the East (Arabic: بطريركيّة أنطاكية وسائر المشرق للروم الأرثوذكس, romanized: Baṭriyarkiyyat ʾAnṭākiya wa-Sāʾir al-Mašriq li-r-Rūm al-ʾUrṯūḏuks, lit. 'Patriarchate of Antioch and All the East for the Orthodox Rum'), is an autocephalous Eastern Orthodox church in full communion with the other autocephalous Eastern Orthodox churches and originates from the ancient Church of Antioch. Headed by the Greek Orthodox patriarch of Antioch, it considers itself the successor to the Christian community founded in Antioch by the Apostles Peter and Paul. It is one of the largest Christian denominations of the Middle East, alongside the Copts of Egypt and the Maronites of Lebanon.

Its adherents, known as Antiochian Christians, are a Middle Eastern ethnoreligious Eastern Christian group residing in the Levant region, including the Hatay Province of Turkey. Many of their descendants now live in the global Eastern Christian diaspora. The number of Antiochian Orthodox Christians is estimated to be approximately 4.3 million.

== Name and identity ==
=== "There is neither Jew nor Greek" ===
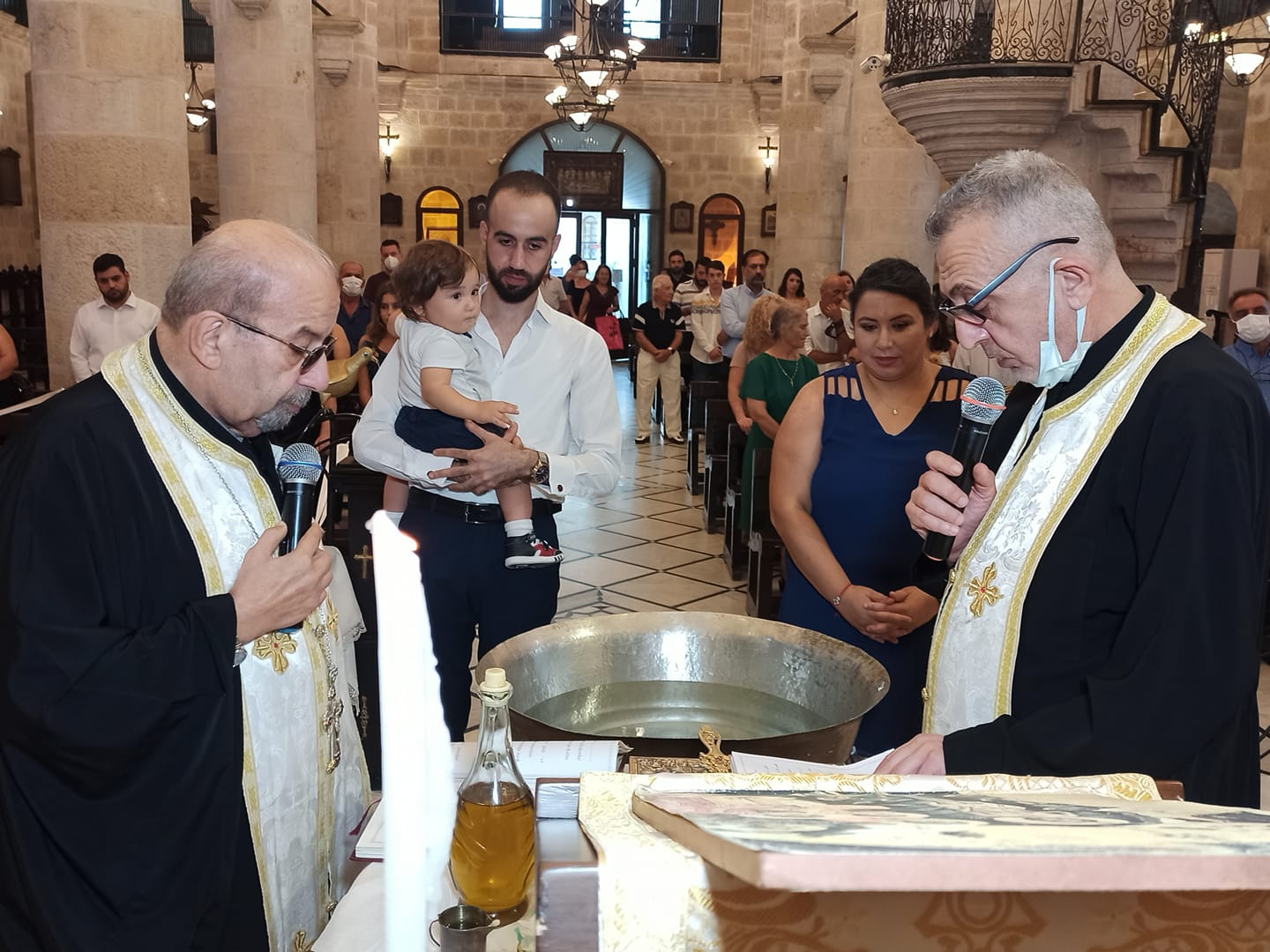
Antiochian Orthodox Christians from Antakya (ancient Antioch)

These ethno-cultural and social tensions were eventually surmounted by the emergence of a new, typically Antiochian Greek doctrine (doxa) spearheaded by Paul (himself a Hellenized Cilician Jew) and his followers be they 1. Established, autochthonous Hellenized Cilician-Western Syrian Jews (themselves descendants of Babylonian and 'Asian' Jewish migrants who had adopted early on various elements of Greek culture and civilization while retaining a generally conservative attachment to Jewish laws & traditions), 2. Heathen, 'Classical' Greeks, Greco-Macedonian and Greco-Syrian gentiles, and 3. the local, autochthonous descendants of Greek or Greco-Syrian converts to mainstream Judaism – known as "Proselytes" (Greek: προσήλυτος/proselytes or 'newcomers to Israel') and Greek-speaking Jews born of mixed marriages.

Paul's efforts were probably facilitated by the arrival of a fourth wave of Greek-speaking newcomers to Syria (especially in Cilicia, Galilee, Aleppo and Jerusalem): Cypriot and 'Cyrenian' (Libyan) Jewish migrants of non-Egyptian North African Jewish origin and gentile Roman settlers from Italy — many of whom already spoke fluent Koine Greek and/or sent their children to Greco-Syrian schools. Some scholars believe that, at the time, these Cypriot and Cyrenian North African Jewish migrants were generally less affluent than the autochthonous Cilician-Syrian Jews and practiced a more 'liberal' form of Judaism, more propitious for the formation of a new canon:

[North African] Cyrenian Jews were of sufficient importance in those days to have their name associated with a synagogue at Jerusalem (Acts 6:9). And when the persecution arose about Stephen [a Hellenized Syrian-Cilician Jew, and one of the first known converts to Christianity], some of these Jews of Cyrene who had been converted at Jerusalem, were scattered abroad and came with others to Antioch [...] and one of them, Lucius, became a prophet in the early church there [the Greek-speaking 'Orthodox' Church of Antioch].

These subtle, progressive socio-cultural shifts are somehow summarized succinctly in Chapter 3 of the Epistle to the Galatians:

There is neither Jew nor Greek: there is neither slave nor free: there is neither male nor female. For you are all one in Christ Jesus (Galatians 3:28).

=== Dual self-designation: "Melkites" and "Eastern Romans" ===
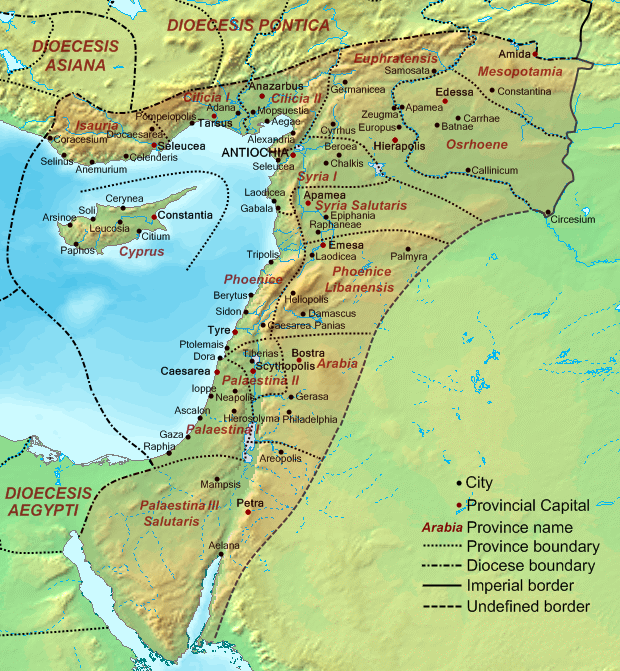
Map of the Diocese of the East 400 AD, homeland of the Christian Rūm; showing modern day Lebanon, Syria, Turkey, Israel, Palestine and Jordan

The unique combination of ethnocultural traits inhered from the fusion of a Greek cultural base, Hellenistic Judaism and Roman civilization gave birth to the distinctly Antiochian "Eastern Mediterranean-Roman" Christian traditions of Cilicia (Southeastern Turkey) and Syria (incl. Lebanon):

The mixture of Roman, Greek, and Jewish elements admirably adapted Antioch for the great part it played in the early history of Christianity. The city was the cradle of the church.

Some of the typically Antiochian ancient liturgical traditions of the community rooted in Hellenistic Judaism and, more generally, Second Temple Greco-Jewish Septuagint culture, were expunged progressively in the late medieval and modern eras by both Phanariot European-Greek (Ecumenical Patriarch of Constantinople) and Vatican (Roman Catholic) theologians who sought to 'bring back' Levantine Greek Orthodox and Greek-Catholic communities into the European Christian fold.

But members of the community in Southern Turkey, Syria and Lebanon still call themselves Rūm (روم), which means Eastern Romans or Asian Greeks in Arabic. In that particular context, the term Rūm is used in preference to Yūnāniyyūn (يونانيون), which means European Greeks or Ionians in Biblical Hebrew (borrowed from Old Persian Yavan) and Classical Arabic. Members of the community also call themselves Melkites, which literally means monarchists or supporters of the emperor in Semitic languages – a reference to their past allegiance to Greco-Macedonian, Roman and Byzantine imperial rule. But, in the modern era, the term tends to be more commonly used by followers of the Greek Catholic Church of Antioch and Alexandria and Jerusalem.

=== Antiochian Greek Orthodox Christians and Arab nationalism ===
Following the fall of the Ottoman Empire and the Russian Empire, the latter of which had long served as a protector of Greek Orthodox minorities in the Levant, and the subsequent rise of French colonialism, communism, Islamism, and Zionism, some members of the Greek Orthodox Church of Antioch embraced secularism and Arab nationalism as a means of modernizing the newly established states of Syria and Lebanon. They also viewed these ideologies as a potential alternative to political Islam, communism, and Zionism, which were often perceived as marginalizing Byzantine Christian minorities. Various (sometimes secular) intellectuals from an Antiochian Greek Orthodox background played an important role in the development of Ba'athism. Among the most prominent was Michel Aflaq, one of the movement's founders.

== History ==
=== I–IV centuries ===
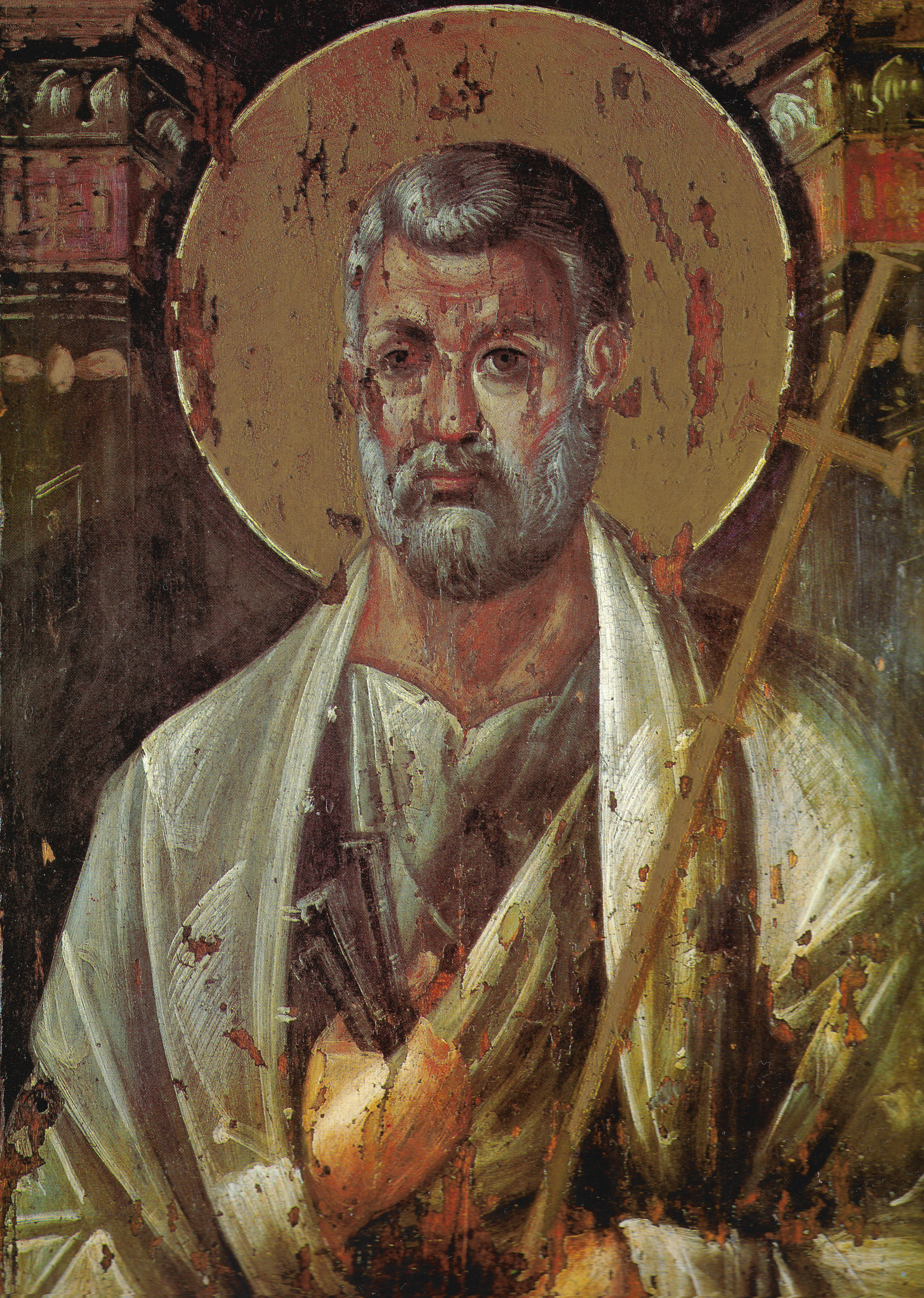
A 6th-century encaustic icon from Saint Catherine's Monastery, Egypt, depicting Peter the Apostle

According to Luke the Evangelist—himself a Greco-Syrian member of that community—the distinctive identity of the Antiochian Church emerged at an early stage:

The disciples were first called Christians in Antioch.

— Acts 11:26 (New Testament, NIV translation)

St Peter and St Paul are traditionally regarded as the co-founders of the Patriarchate of Antioch, with Peter considered its first bishop. When Peter left Antioch, Evodios assumed leadership, followed by Ignatius. Both Evodios and Ignatius died as martyrs during Roman persecutions.

Saint Evodius served as Bishop of Antioch until 66 AD, and he was succeeded by Saint Ignatius the God-bearer. In 169 AD, Theophilus of Antioch wrote three apologetic treatises addressed to Autolycus.

Patriarch Babylas of Antioch is regarded as the first saint whose remains were translated for religious purposes—a practice that became extremely widespread in the following centuries.

Hellenistic Judaism and Judeo-Greek "wisdom" literature, widespread during the late Second Temple period among both Hellenized Rabbinical Jews (Mityavnim in Hebrew) and gentile Greek proselyte converts to Judaism, played an important role in shaping the Melkite-Antiochian Greek Orthodox tradition. Elements of typically Grecian "Ancient Synagogal" priestly rites and hymns have partially survived to the present day in the distinctive church service, architecture, and iconography of the Melkite Greek Orthodox and Greek Catholic communities of the Hatay Province of southern Turkey, Syria, and Lebanon.

Some historians believe that a substantial proportion of the Hellenized Jewish population and most gentile Greco-Macedonian settlers in southern Turkey (Antioch, Alexandretta and neighboring cities) as well as Syria and Lebanon—referred to in the Acts as Hellenistai—gradually converted to the Greco-Roman form of Christianity that later became the Melkite (or Imperial) Hellenistic churches of Western Asia and North Africa:

As Jewish Christianity originated at Jerusalem, so Gentile Christianity started at Antioch, then the leading center of the Hellenistic East, with Peter and Paul as its apostles. From Antioch it spread to the various cities and provinces of Syria, among the Hellenistic Syrians as well as among the Hellenistic Jews who, as a result of the great rebellions against the Romans in A.D. 70 and 130, were driven out from Jerusalem and Palestine into Syria.

Acts 6 highlights the cultural tensions between Greek-speaking Judeo-Christians associated with Antioch and related Cilician, southern Anatolian, and Syrian diasporas, and the more conservative Aramaic-speaking Jewish Christians centered in Jerusalem:

The 'Hebrews' were Jewish Christians who spoke almost exclusively Aramaic, and the 'Hellenists' were also Jewish Christians whose mother tongue was Greek... As the very context of Acts 6 makes clear, the Hellenistai are not Hellenes.

In 313 AD, emperors Constantine I and Licinius issued the Edict of Milan, which permitted the free profession of any religion within the Empire. Around the same time, the spread of the heresy of Arianism began, leading to a schism that lasted until 381.

Eustathius of Antioch supported Athanasius of Alexandria in his opposition to the teachings of Arius during the Arian controversy at the First Council of Nicaea.

During the episcopate of Meletius of Antioch, the struggle against Arianism reached its peak. Meletius was deposed by Emperor Constantius II but later restored under Emperor Julian, exiled again, returned by Emperor Jovian, and once more exiled by Valens. Under Emperor Theodosius, who held him in special esteem, Meletius was elected to preside over the Second Ecumenical Council.

In the 4th century, monasticism spread throughout Syria. Unlike Egyptian monasticism, early Syrian monasticism was less secluded: monks engaged in missionary preaching and charitable activity. In the 5th century, stylitism emerged—an ascetic form of seclusion practiced atop pillars or rocky outcrops (see Simeon Stylites).

=== IV—VII centuries ===
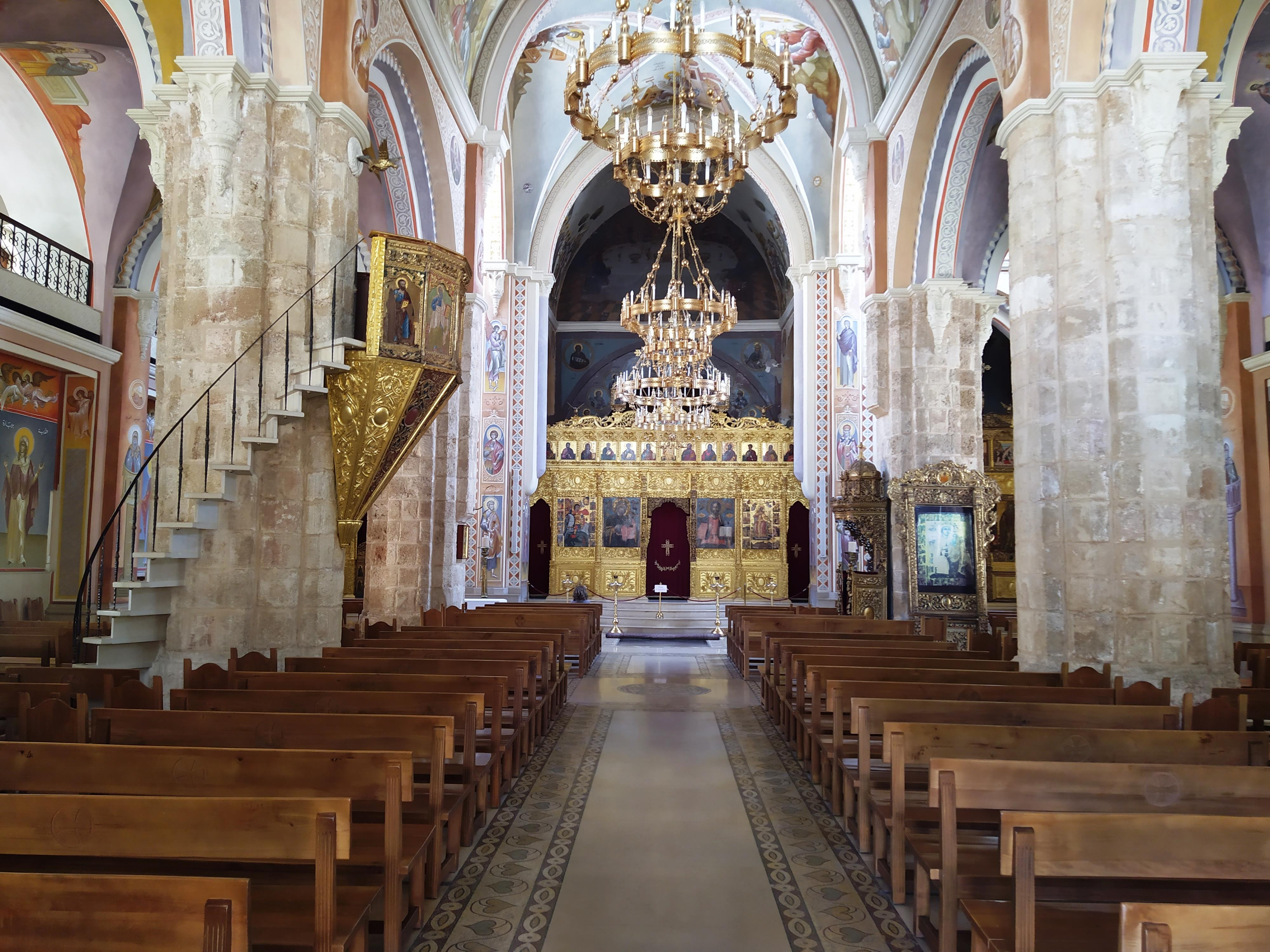
St. George Greek Orthodox Cathedral Beirut, Lebanon

Given the antiquity of the Antiochian Church and the importance of the Christian community in the city of Antioch, as well as its economic significance in the eastern part of the Roman Empire, the First Council of Nicaea in 325 recognized the church’s prominence, naming it one of the main regional primacies in the Christian world, with jurisdiction over the territory of the Diocese of the East, thus laying the foundation for the creation of the "Patriarchate of Antioch and All the East".

The Antiochian Patriarchate, and Syria in general, was one of the most troubled regions of the Roman Empire. At the beginning of the 5th century, Christological disturbances began to emerge. Although the Antiochian School of Theology was the founder of dyophysite Christology, a strong faction in Syria also supported the theology of Cyril of Alexandria. After the practical defeat of the Nestorians in the Roman Empire, the Christological conflict following the Council of Chalcedon in 451 occurred primarily between supporters and opponents of the council. In 512, Patriarch Flavian II was deposed by the Monophysite Emperor Anastasius I (d. 518). On November 6, 512, at a synod in Laodicea in Syria, the Miaphysite theologian Severus of Antioch (d. 538) was elected patriarch. He was ordained on November 16 in the Golden House. However, in 518 he was deposed by Emperor Justinian I (d. 527). A new patriarch, Paul the Jew, was appointed.

However, the majority of Antiochian Christians did not recognize the Council of Chalcedon, also refused to acknowledge the new patriarch; they would become known as the Syriac Orthodox Church of Antioch. The non-Chalcedonian community was divided between the "Severians" (followers of Severus) and the Aphthartodocetists, a division that remained unresolved until 527.

After the deposition of the Miaphysite patriarch Severus of Antioch in 518 by Emperor Justinian I and the near-total destruction of the episcopate that did not recognize the Council of Chalcedon, the state-recognized Antiochian Church became fully dyophysite. Around the 550s, Jacob Baradeus effectively restored the Miaphysite structure, essentially creating the Syriac Orthodox Church.

Before the Chalcedonian Patriarchate of Antioch became purely Greek and the non-Chalcedonian purely Syrian, attempts to overcome the division continued. In the early 7th century, Emperor Heraclius—with a strong intention to unite the Universal Church—appointed Miaphysite patriarchs to all leading sees and proposed a compromise doctrine of Monothelitism. However, this initiative did not take root, and the patriarchates were once again divided.

=== VII—XI centuries ===
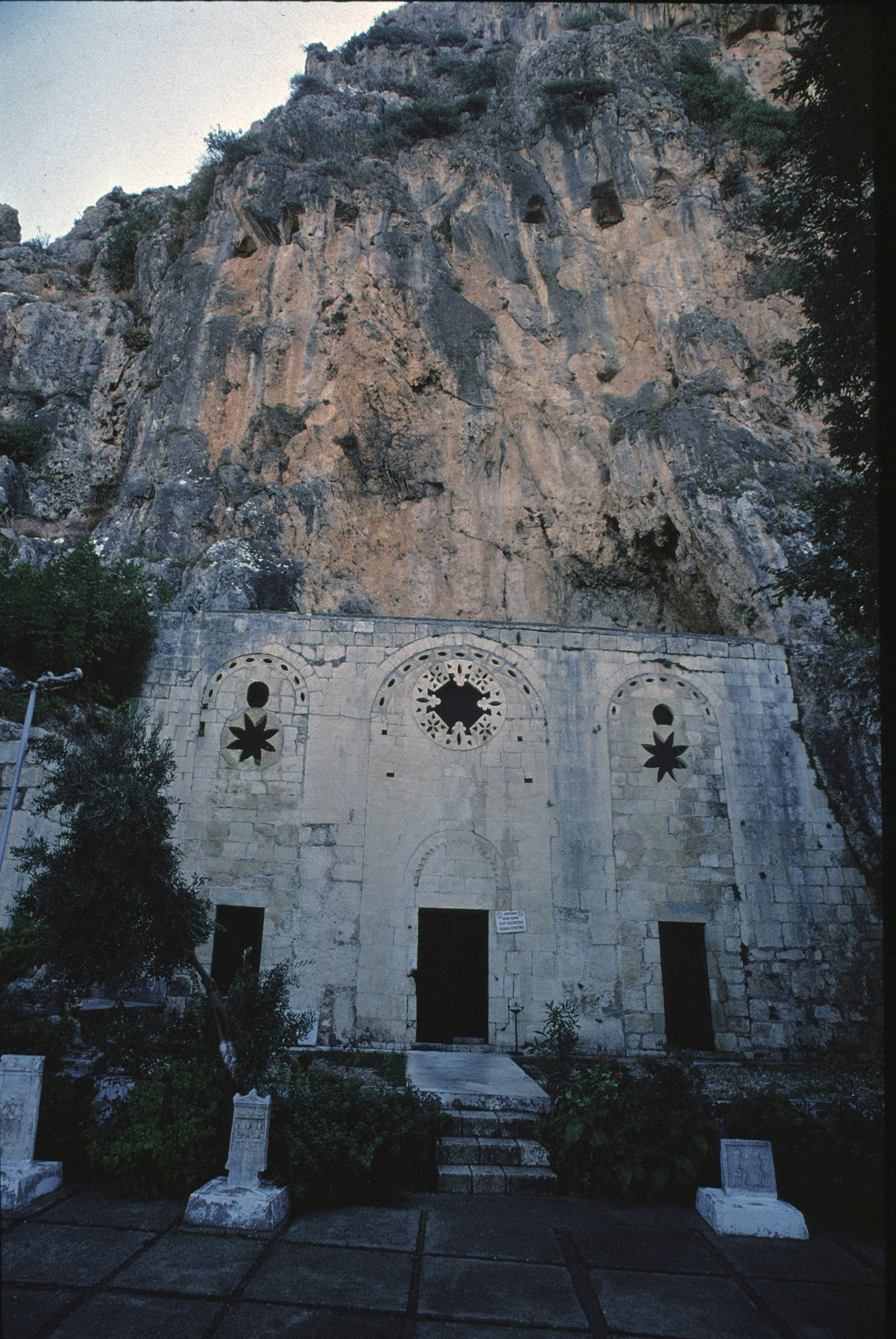
Church of Saint Peter in Antioch

From 637, Syria came under the rule of the Arab Caliphate. The situation of the Greek Orthodox was severely complicated, as the Arabs considered them not only "infidels" but also allies of Byzantium. For this reason, the Antiochian Greek patriarchs were forced to live in exile in Constantinople, and after the death of George II (c. 702), this line was interrupted. Only in 742 did Caliph Hisham allow the election of the Syrian monk Stephen to the Antiochian see, on the condition of his complete loyalty.

Cooperation with Muslim authorities sometimes exceeded all limits. For example, Patriarch Job accompanied the Arab army in the campaign against Amorium in 838 and persuaded Byzantine fortresses to surrender to the Arabs.

Byzantine Emperor Nikephoros II Phokas (963–969), after several victories over the Arabs, liberated Antioch and several other territories. However, the military failures of the Muslims increased interconfessional tension: every triumph of Nikephoros provoked pogroms against Christians in Palestine and Syria. One of the victims of these persecutions was the Antiochian Patriarch Christopher, who was killed in 967.

The Byzantine period, lasting until 1084, became an era of revival for the patriarchate.

=== XI—XVI centuries ===
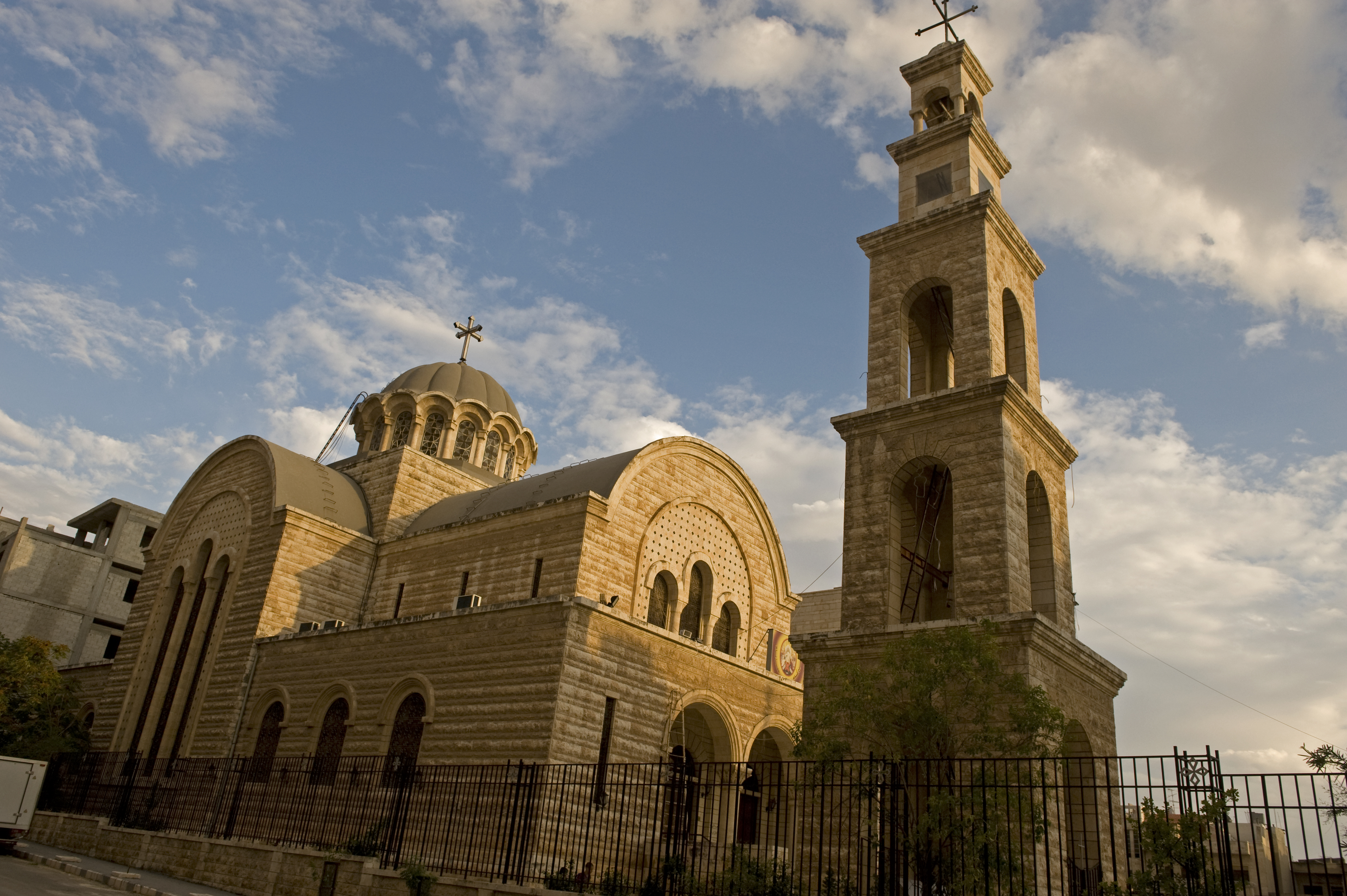
Saint George's Cathedral in Hama

In December 1084, during a sudden strike, the Seljuks captured Antioch. The mere establishment of Seljuk rule in the Near East in the late 11th century did not result in a significant deterioration of the social status of local Christians. They suffered mainly, like the rest of the population, from political instability in Syria, endless wars of small emirates, and forced territorial partitions.

In 1097, European Crusaders appeared in the Eastern Mediterranean. After the Crusaders’ victories, the relations between them and the local Christians were "complex and ambiguous," not simply friendly or hostile. Local Christians felt closer ties with their fellow Crusader-Christians than with Arab Muslims.

Nevertheless, some scholars agree that relations between Orthodox and Catholics in Outremer were generally good. This is evidenced by the growth of the Orthodox population in the Principality of Antioch, including an influx of refugees from other regions under Muslim rule.

However, the Latins still considered their Eastern co-religionists as inferior Christians, attempting to subject Orthodox Christians to Catholic clergy. By 1100, Patriarch John the Oxite was expelled from Antioch, replaced by the Latin prelate Bernard of Valencia. Latin patriarchs soon began replacing Orthodox bishops with Catholics in conquered territories, forcing the Antiochian see into exile in Constantinople.

These Catholic persecutions did not last long. In 1165, Antiochian Prince Bohemond III had to appeal to Byzantine Emperor Manuel I Komnenos, who demanded the immediate restoration of the Orthodox hierarchy and equal rights with Catholics. Thereafter, Patriarch Athanasius I arrived in the city and began residing at the Cathedral of St. Peter.

By 1291, the Crusaders lost their last possessions in the East. They were replaced by fanatical Mamluks, who destroyed churches and exterminated the clergy to eradicate any trace of Christianity. As a result, Christians, who had constituted nearly half of the population of Syria and Palestine in the 11th century, became an overwhelming minority over the next 200 years, scattered across small communities. Their situation worsened further after the fall of Byzantium in 1453.

In 1342, the Patriarchal see was transferred to Damascus, where it remains to this day.

=== XVI—XIX centuries ===
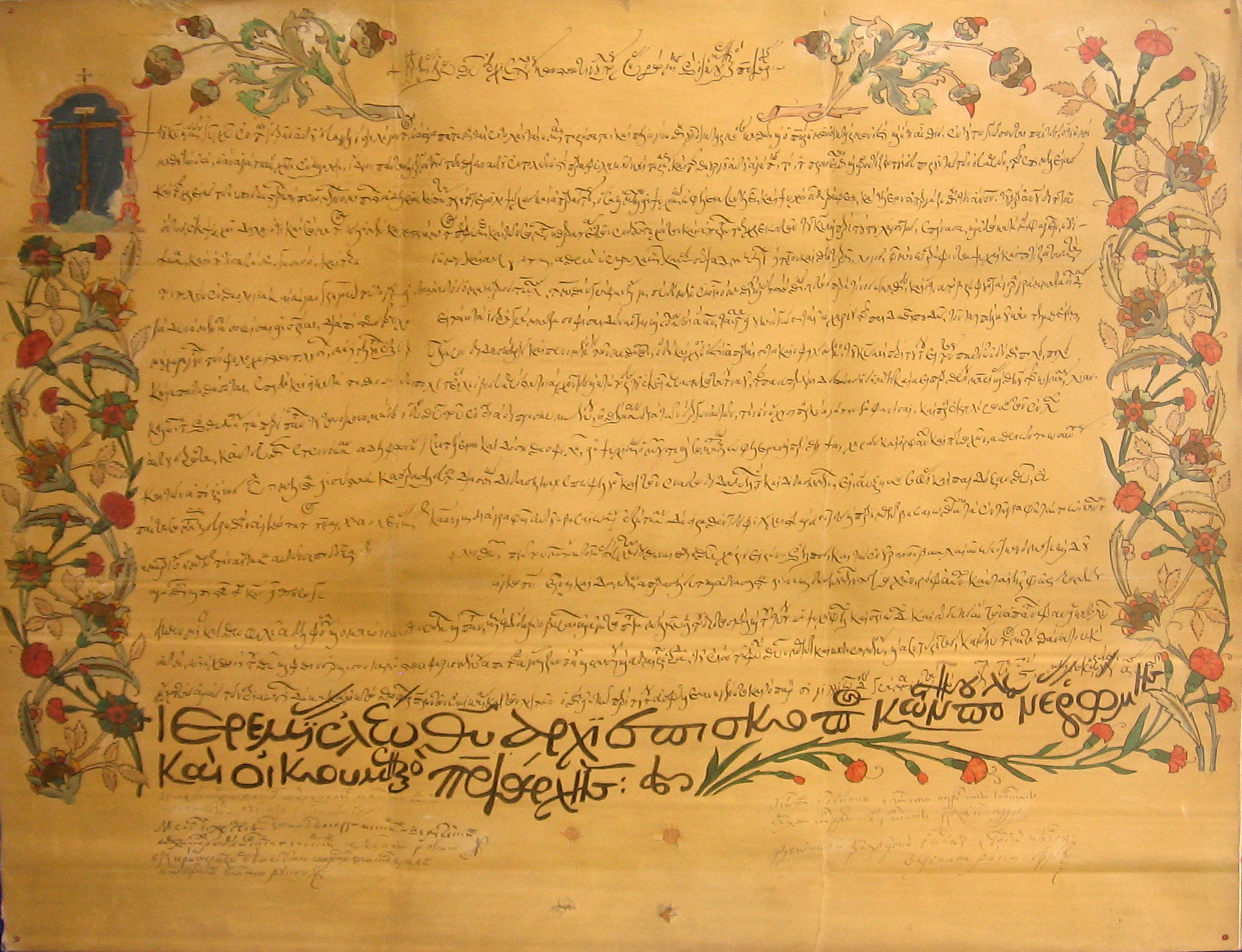
Epistle of the Patriarch of Antioch to the Lviv Dormition Brotherhood, 1586

In 1517, Damascus was captured by the Ottoman Empire, and the Antiochian patriarch came under the administrative authority of the Patriarch of Constantinople. In Syria, the Church was subjected to a special tax for non-Muslims, and for delayed payments even metropolitans or patriarchs could be imprisoned. At the same time, the Orthodox community was not subjected to systematic religious persecution, and there were no recorded cases of mass or forced Islamization in the Arab provinces of the Ottoman Empire. The only period of persecution of Orthodox Christians in the Near East was connected with the Greek uprising of the 1820s, when Patriarch Seraphim narrowly escaped execution.

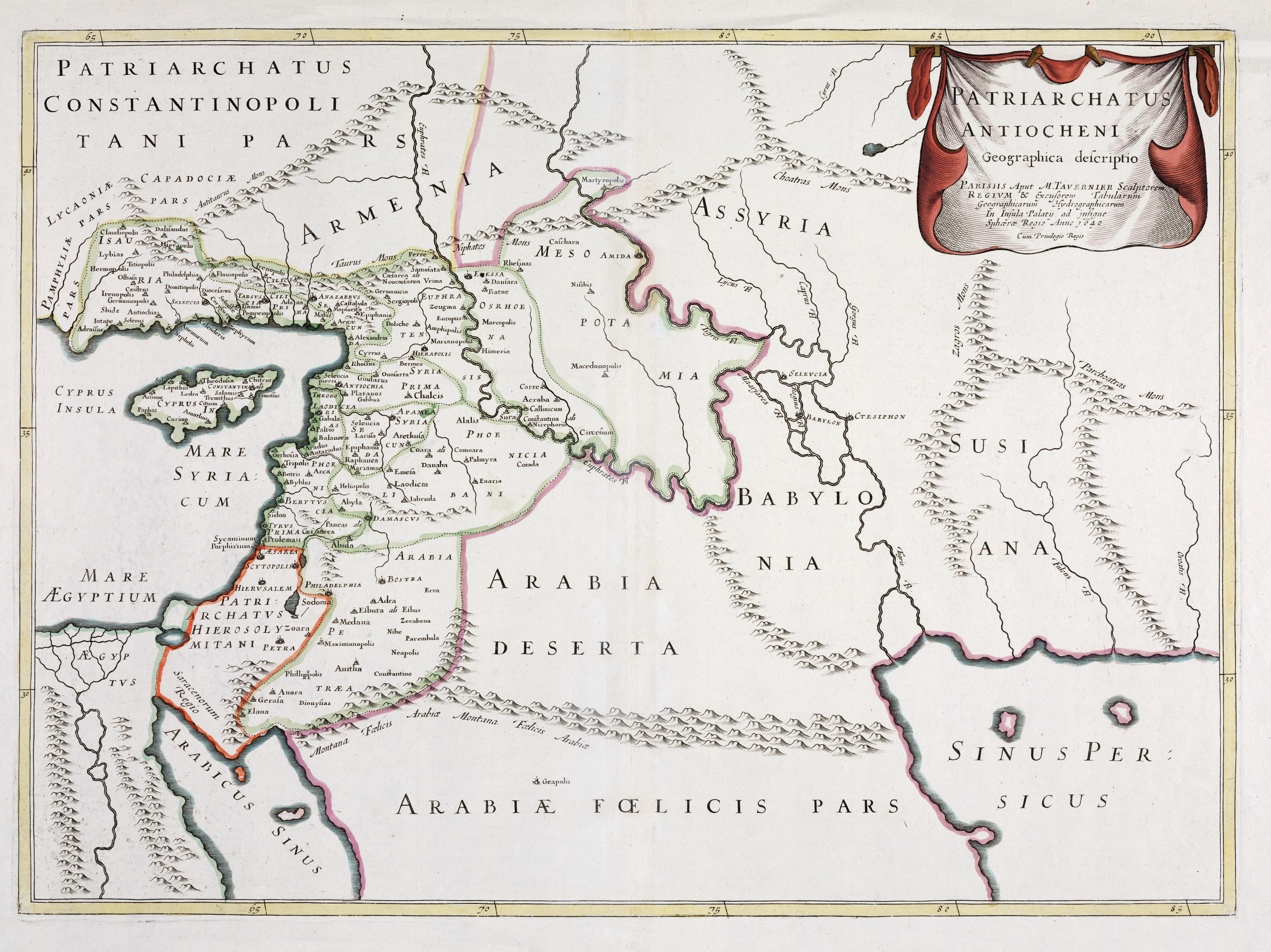
Patriarchatus Antiocheni, 1640, by Melchior Tavernier

In 1724, Cyril VI Tanas was elected the new patriarch of Antioch. As Cyril was considered to be pro-Western, the Patriarch Jeremias III of Constantinople feared that his own authority would be compromised by the former's ascent; Jeremias therefore declared Cyril's election to be invalid, excommunicated him, and ordained the Greek hierodeacon Sylvester of Antioch as a priest and bishop, so that the latter might take Cyril's place.

Sylvester—considered "unyielding and uncompromising" by both supporters and opponents—exacerbated divisions within the Church with his heavy-handed rule, and many Melkites reacted by instead acknowledging Cyril's claim to the patriarchal throne. Sylvester began a five-year campaign of persecution enforced by Ottoman Turkish troops against Cyril and the Melkite faithful who supported him, forcing him to find refuge in Lebanon.

Five years after the election of Cyril VI, in 1729, Pope Benedict XIII recognized him as patriarch of Antioch and recognized his followers as being in full communion with the Catholic Church and the Pope of Rome, thus formalizing the schism and the formation of the Melkite Greek Catholic Church.

According to various estimates, the number of Orthodox believers in the Antiochian Patriarchate in the mid-19th century reached 60–110 thousand (approximately 8–9% of the total population of Syria).

In 1860, Syrian Christians suffered a tragedy when, during a massacre and pogrom in Damascus, a significant part of the city’s Christian community was destroyed and all churches were ruined.

In 1898, the election of an Arab-Syrian candidate to the patriarchal throne was diplomatically supported by Russian diplomacy, with the participation of the Imperial Orthodox Palestine Society, in the context of the Arab Orthodox Movement. Meletius (Dumani) was elected patriarch in 1898 and enthroned in April 1899. Since then, the Patriarch of Antioch has been elected from among Orthodox Arabs.

=== Modern history ===
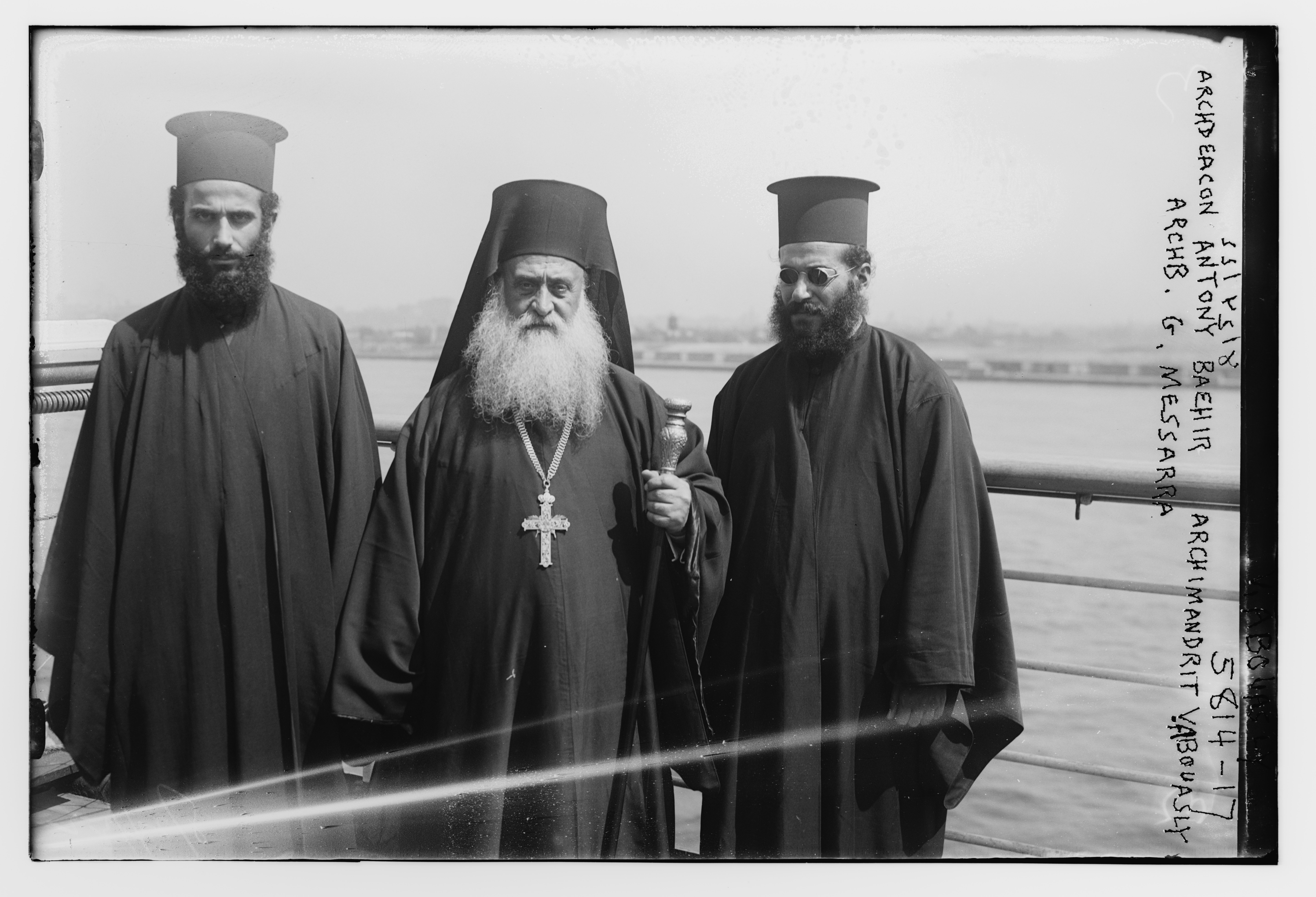
Founders of the Antiochian Orthodox Archdiocese of North America

Since 1908, the patriarchate annually received 30,000 rubles from the personal funds of the Russian Emperor Nicholas II. In 1913, Patriarch of Antioch Gregory IV made an official visit to Russia, participating in the celebrations of the 300th anniversary of the Romanov dynasty and in many services in various cities of the empire.

According to the Lausanne Treaty of 1923, part of the territory of the Antiochian Orthodox Church — Cilicia, Şanlıurfa, and Mardin — became part of the Republic of Turkey; by agreement with Greece on population exchange, all Orthodox were deported from these areas, despite protests and claims that they were Arabs, not Greeks. On the eve of World War II, the French authorities handed over the district of Alexandretta, where Antioch is located, to Turkey. This action worsened the situation of the local Christian population.

In 1929, part of the Orthodox population of Lebanon sought the creation of an autocephalous Lebanese Church, arguing that ecclesiastical independence was a logical consequence of political sovereignty. These aspirations were supported by the French authorities but met with strong opposition from Syrians. After tense negotiations in Beirut and Zahlé (1929), the parties agreed that the patriarchal see would remain in Damascus. The prolonged election procedure for a new patriarch ended in February 1931 with the election in Beirut of a candidate from the Lebanese faction, Metropolitan of Laodicea Arsenius (Haddad). Soon thereafter, Metropolitan of Tripoli Alexander (Tahhan) was elected in Damascus. After Arsenius’ death in January 1933, he united the entire patriarchate under his authority.

Throughout the 20th century, Arab Christians emigrated from the Middle East, many settling in North America, where until 1918 they were under the jurisdiction of the Russian Orthodox Church. After the Russian Revolution of 1917, which caused ecclesiastical unrest in North America, the Syrian-Arab parishes partly joined the Russian North American Metropolia and partly remained under the direct jurisdiction of the Antiochian Patriarchate.

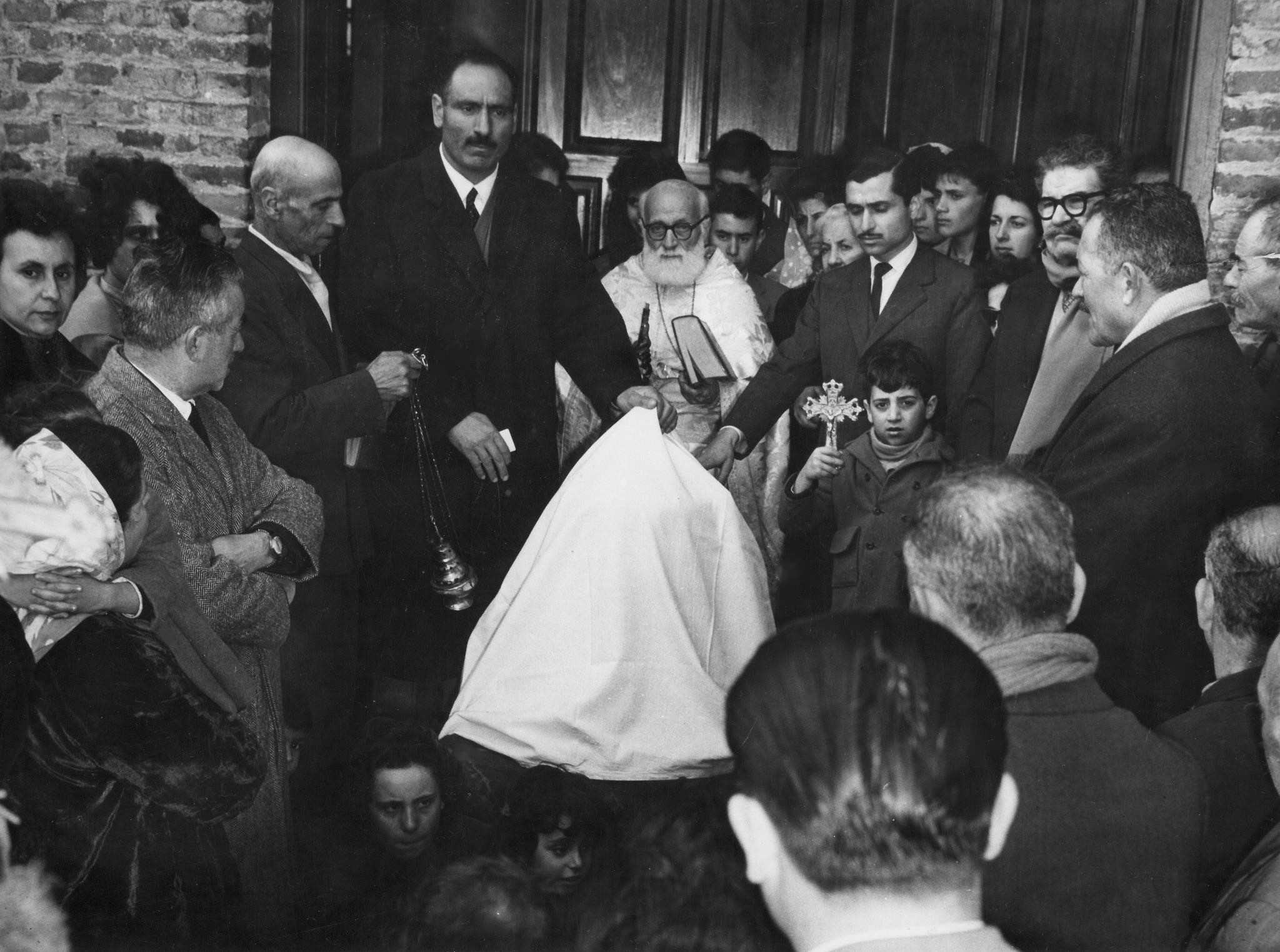
Antiochian Orthodox Christians from Junín, Argentina, 1962

The Antiochian Patriarchate managed to reach an agreement with the Russian North American Metropolia to transfer all Arab dioceses under its omophorion, but the planned ordination of two bishops in 1936 led to a new schism. Instead of ordaining one of them as a vicar bishop, the hierarchs of the Russian Orthodox Church Abroad, within which the North American Metropolia was then included, ordained him as Archbishop of Toledo, creating a separate independent church.

In 1972, the current Charter of the Greek Orthodox Patriarchate of Antioch and All the East was adopted by the Holy Synod of Antioch.

Only in 1975 was the schism of the Antiochian Church in America overcome: on 24 June 1975, Metropolitan Philip (Saliba) of the Antiochian Archdiocese of New York and Metropolitan Michael (Shaheen) of the Antiochian Archdiocese of Toledo (Ohio) signed the "Articles of Reunification" — a document restoring administrative unity among the Antiochian Orthodox in the USA and Canada; on 19 August 1975, the "Articles" were approved by the Synod of the Antiochian Patriarchate.

In October 2003, the Antiochian Patriarchate’s North American metropolias were granted self-governance by the Synod; vicar bishops of the metropolia were elevated to diocesan rank.

In March 2013, the Jerusalem Patriarchate appointed Archbishop Makarios (Mavrogiannakis) as bishop to the newly established Qatar Diocese, asserting its historical and canonical jurisdiction over the region as part of its broader ecclesiastical presence in the Arabian Peninsula. This decision was strongly opposed by the Antiochian Orthodox Church, which claimed that Qatar fell within its canonical territory as part of the Patriarchate of Antioch’s jurisdiction over all of the Arabian Peninsula. Negotiations between the two patriarchates failed to resolve the dispute, despite mediation attempts within the wider Orthodox world.

Since none of the Antiochian Patriarchate’s demands were met, on 27 June 2015, the Synod of the Antiochian Patriarchate decided to sever "all ecclesiastical communion" with the Jerusalem Patriarchate, deepening the rift and marking one of the most serious inter-Orthodox disputes of the 21st century.

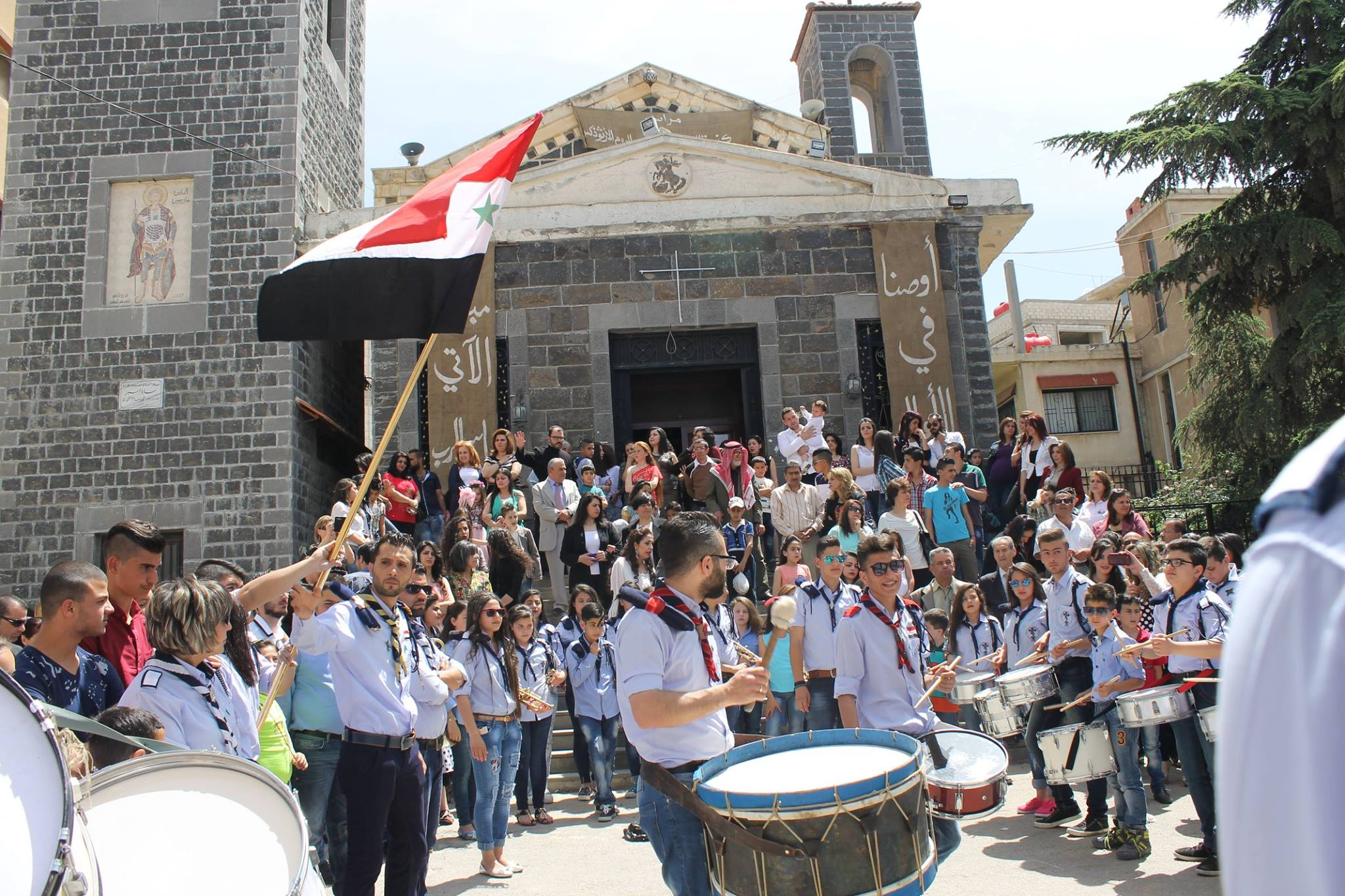
Orthodox Easter in As-Suwayda

In 2023, in the context of the armed conflict in Israel and Gaza Strip, the Holy Synod of the Antiochian Patriarchate decided to restore communion with the Jerusalem Orthodox Church, citing the need to support the faithful of the Jerusalem Patriarchate in the difficult conditions caused by the conflict and to demonstrate pan-Orthodox unity in a time of crisis. The Jerusalem Patriarchate received and welcomed the decision of the Patriarchate of Antioch, thereby ending the schism.

On 22 June 2025, during the Divine Liturgy at the Antiochian Orthodox Mar Elias Church in Damascus, the capital of Syria, a suicide bomber detonated an explosive device, killing 30 people and injuring 54 others. The Islamist terrorist group Saraya Ansar al-Sunnah claimed responsibility for the attack, while the Syrian government attributed it to the Islamic State.

== Demographics ==
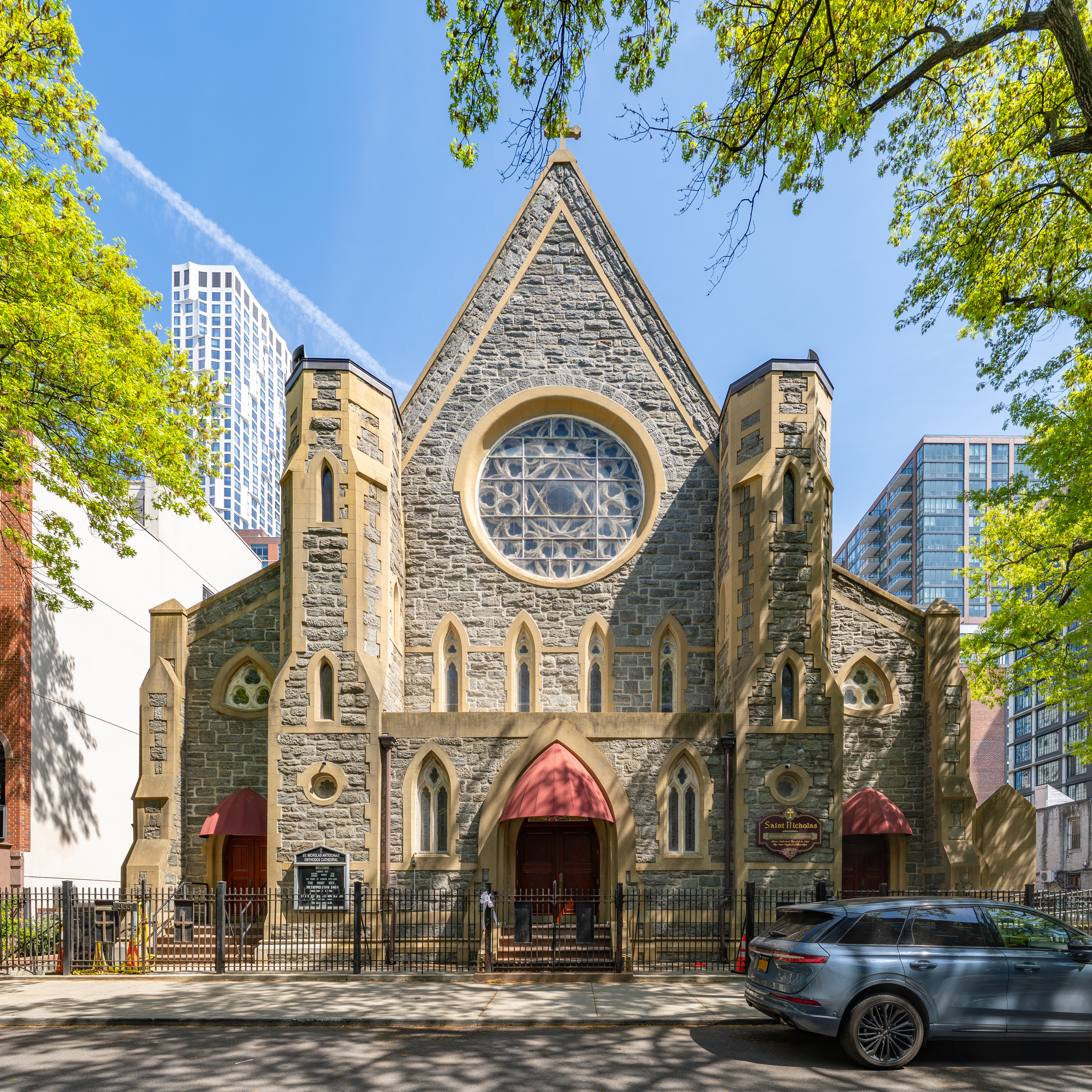
St. Nicholas Antiochian Orthodox Cathedral (Brooklyn)

The majority of the adherents of the Greek Orthodox Church of Antioch are ethnic Arabs, primarily from Syria and Lebanon.

Prior to the outbreak of the Syrian Civil War in 2011, Syria had an estimated Christian population of approximately 2.1 million, accounting for around 10% of the country's total population. Of these, more than 1.1 million, roughly half of all Syrian Christians, belonged to the Greek Orthodox Church of Antioch. The civil war led to a significant decline in Syria's Christian population, as large numbers of Christians emigrated abroad, particularly to Europe, the Americas, and other countries in the Middle East.

Lebanon has approximately 312,725 Greek Orthodox Christians, who account for around 8% of the country's population and constitute the second-largest Christian denomination after the Maronite Church.

In addition, a significant proportion of the Church's adherents are descendants of Middle Eastern Christians who emigrated to Western countries during the early 20th century, as well as individuals who converted to Eastern Orthodoxy in the 21st century.

== Administration and structure ==
The administration and structure of the Antiochian See are governed by statutes.

World jurisdictions of Eastern Orthodox churches as of 2022.

=== Patriarchate ===
The patriarch is elected by the Holy Synod from among the metropolitans who compose it. The patriarch presides the Holy Synod and executes its decisions. He also acts as metropolitan of the Archdiocese of Antioch and Damascus.

The current patriarch, John X (Yazigi), was elected on December 17, 2012, succeeding to Metropolitan Saba Esber, who had been elected locum tenens on December 7, 2012, following Ignatius IV (Hazim)'s death.

=== Archdioceses and metropolitans ===
There are at present 22 archdioceses, each headed by a metropolitan.

==== Western Asia ====
- Archdiocese of Antioch and Damascus: patriarchal archdiocese
- Archdiocese of Akkar and Dependencies (Wadi al-Nasara, Safita and Tartus): Basilios Mansour (2008–)
- Archdiocese of Aleppo and their Dependencies: Ephreim Maalouli (2021–)
- Archdiocese of Beirut and Exarchate of Phœnicia: Elias Audi (1980–)
- Archdiocese of Baghdad, Kuwait and Dependencies: Ghattas Hazim (2014–)
- Archdiocese of Bosra, Hauran and Jabal al-Arab: Saba Esber (1999–)
- Archdiocese of Byblos and Batroun: Siluan Muci (2018–)
- Archdiocese of Hama (Epiphania) and Exarchate of North Syria: Nicholas Baalbaki (2017–)
- Archdiocese of Homs (Emesa): George Khoury (2023–)
- Archdiocese of Latakia (Laodicea ad Mare) and Exarchate of Theodorias: Athanasius Fahd (2018–)
- Archdiocese of Diyarbakır: Paul Yazigi (2021–)
- Archdiocese of Tarsus, Adana, and Alexandretta: newly established on 13 October 2025, and provisionally headed by a patriarchal representative.
- Archdiocese of Tripoli and Koura: Ephraim Kyriakos (2009–)
- Archdiocese of Tyre and Sidon: Elias Kfoury (1995–)
- Archdiocese of Zahleh and Baalbek (Heliopolis): Antonios El Soury (Nov 14, 2015–)

==== Asia and Oceania ====
- Archdiocese of Australia, New Zealand and the Philippines: Basilios Qoudsiah (2017–)

==== Europe ====
- Archdiocese of the British Isles and Ireland: Silouan Oner (2015–)
- Archdiocese of France, Western and Southern Europe: Ignatius Alhoushi (2013–)
- Archdiocese of Germany and Central Europe: Isaac Barakat (2013–)

==== The Americas ====
- Archdiocese of North America (Englewood, New Jersey); Metropolitan of New York and All North America: Saba (Esber) (2023–)
  - Diocese of Oakland, Charleston, and the Mid-Atlantic: Thomas Joseph (2004–)
  - Diocese of Eagle River and the Northwest: vacant
  - Diocese of Los Angeles and the West: Anthony Michaels (2014–)
  - Diocese of New York and Washington, D.C.: Metropolitical diocese
  - Diocese of Miami and the Southeast: Nicholas Ozone (2017–)
  - Diocese of Ottawa, Eastern Canada and Upstate New York: Alexander Mufarrij (2004–)
  - Diocese of Toledo and the Mid-West: Jeremy (Davis), Archiepiscopal Vicar (2024–)
  - Diocese of Wichita and Mid-America: Basil (Essey) (2003–)
  - Diocese of Worcester and New England: John Abdallah (2011–)
- Archdiocese of Buenos Aires and All Argentina: Jacob Khoury (2018–)
- Archdiocese of Mexico, Venezuela, Central America and the Caribbean: Ignatius Samaan (2017–)
- Archdiocese of Santiago and All Chile: Sergios Abad (1996–), Bishop of Salamias and Patriarchal Auxiliary for Chile (1988–1996)
- Archdiocese of São Paulo and All Brazil: Damaskinos Mansour (1997–)

=== Titular dioceses and bishops ===
- Diocese of Shahba: Niphon Saykali (1988–), elevated to archbishop in 2009 and elevated to metropolitan in 2014, Representative of the Patriarch of Antioch and All the East at the Patriarch of Moscow and All Russia
- Diocese of Darayya: Moussa Khoury (1995–), Patriarchal Assistant – Damascus
- Diocese of Saidnaya: Luka Khoury (1999–), Patriarchal Assistant – Damascus
- Diocese of Banias: Demetrios Charbak (2011–), Auxiliary Bishop in Safita, Archdiocese of Akkar
- Diocese of Arthoussa: Elias Toumeh (2011–), Auxiliary Bishop in Marmarita, Archdiocese of Akkar
- Diocese of Zabadani: Constantine Kayal (2011–), Abbot of St Elias – Shwayya Patriarchal Monastery
- Diocese of Palmyra: Youhanna Haikal (2011–), Auxiliary Bishop in the Archdiocese of Germany and Central Europe
- Diocese of Edessa: Romanos Daoud (2011–), Auxiliary Bishop in the Archdiocese of São Paulo and Brazil
- Diocese of the Emirates: Gregorios Khoury-Abdallah (2014–), Assistant Bishop to the Patriarch
- Diocese of Erzurum: Qays Sadek (2014–), Assistant Bishop to the Patriarch
- Diocese of Resafa: Youhanna Batash (2017–)
- Diocese of Apamea: Theodore Ghandour (2017–)

=== Retired bishops ===
- Archdiocese of Byblos and Batroun: Georges Khodr (1970–2018)
- Diocese of Jableh: Demetrios Khoury (1995–2003)
- Diocese of Yabroud: Athanasius Saliba (1979–)

== Daughter churches ==
- Eastern Orthodox
  - Church of Constantinople: Granted autocephaly in 381 CE at the First Council of Constantinople and elevated to the rank of Patriarchate in 451 CE by the Council of Chalcedon.
  - Church of Cyprus: Granted autocephaly in 431 CE, as recognized by the Council of Ephesus.
  - Church of Jerusalem: Originally a bishopric under Cæsarea, it was elevated to the rank of Patriarchate in 451 CE by the Council of Chalcedon, with territory detached from the Patriarchate of Antioch.
  - Church of Georgia: Autocephaly is traditionally believed to have been granted to the Georgian church by the Patriarchate of Antioch between 467 and 491 CE; however, some scholars have proposed a later date, around 1010 CE.
- Catholic
  - Melkite Greek Catholic Church: Formed in 1724 by Cyril VI Tanas, who brought the Antiochian Orthodox community into communion with Rome.

== See also ==
- Christianity in the Middle East
- Early Christianity
- Pentarchy
- List of patriarchs of Antioch – to 518
- List of Greek Orthodox patriarchs of Antioch – 518 to present day
- Eastern Orthodoxy in Syria
- Eastern Orthodoxy in Lebanon
- Eastern Orthodoxy in Turkey
- John of Damascus
- Raphael of Brooklyn

== Sources ==
- Brock, Sebastian P. (2011a). "Liturgy". Gorgias Encyclopedic Dictionary of the Syriac Heritage. Piscataway, NJ: Gorgias Press. pp. 248–251.
- Brock, Sebastian P. (2011b). "Melkite". Gorgias Encyclopedic Dictionary of the Syriac Heritage. Piscataway, NJ: Gorgias Press. p. 285.
- Brock, Sebastian P. (2011c). "Melkite literature in Syriac". Gorgias Encyclopedic Dictionary of the Syriac Heritage. Piscataway, NJ: Gorgias Press. pp. 285–286.
- Dick, Iganatios (2004). Melkites: Greek Orthodox and Greek Catholics of the Patriarchates of Antioch, Alexandria and Jerusalem. Roslindale, MA: Sophia Press. Archived from the original on June 8, 2023.
- Griffith, Sidney H. (2001). "Melkites, Jacobites and the Christological Controversies in Arabic in Third/Ninth-Century Syria". Syrian Christians under Islam: The First Thousand Years. Leiden: Brill. pp. 9–55. ISBN 90-04-12055-6.
- Griffith, Sidney H. (2008). "John of Damascus and the Church in Syria in the Umayyad Era: The Intellectual and Cultural Milieu of Orthodox Christians in the World of Islam" (PDF). Hugoye: Journal of Syriac Studies. 11 (2): 207–237. doi:10.31826/hug-2011-110111. S2CID 212688109.
- Grillmeier, Aloys; Hainthaler, Theresia (2013). Christ in Christian Tradition: The Churches of Jerusalem and Antioch from 451 to 600. Vol. 2/3. Oxford: Oxford University Press. ISBN 978-0-19-921288-0.
- Hohmann, Gregory (2000). "Loyalty to the Emperor and Change of Rite: What Induced the Melkite Church to Exchange the Syrian for the Byzantine Tradition". The Harp. 13: 49–56. doi:10.31826/9781463233013-008. ISBN 978-1-4632-3301-3.
- Kiminas, Demetrius (2009). The Ecumenical Patriarchate: A History of Its Metropolitanates with Annotated Hierarch Catalogs. Wildside Press LLC. ISBN 978-1-4344-5876-6.
- Leonhardt, Christoph (2018). "The Greek- and the Syriac-Orthodox Patriarchates of Antioch in the Context of the Syrian Conflict" (PDF). Chronos: Revue d'Histoire de l'Université de Balamand. 33: 21–54. doi:10.31377/chr.v33i0.92 (inactive July 1, 2025). S2CID 54732620. Archived from the original (PDF) on March 9, 2019.
- Madey, John (1997). "The Rite of Notification and Acceptance of the Episcopal Election in the Melkite Orthodox Patriarchate of Antioch". The Harp. 10: 85–89. doi:10.31826/9781463232993-013. ISBN 978-1-4632-3299-3.
- Meyendorff, John (1989). Imperial unity and Christian divisions: The Church 450-680 A.D. Crestwood, NY: St. Vladimir's Seminary Press. ISBN 978-0-88141-056-3.
- Ostrogorsky, George (1956). History of the Byzantine State. Oxford: Basil Blackwell.
- Panchenko, Constantin A. (2021). Orthodoxy and Islam in the Middle East: The Seventh to the Sixteenth Centuries. Jordanville, NY: Holy Trinity Publications. ISBN 978-1-942699-33-0.
- Poujeau, Anna (2010). "Monasteries, Politics, and Social Memory: The Revival of the Greek Orthodox Church of Antioch in Syria during the Twentieth Century". Eastern Christians in Anthropological Perspective. Berkeley: University of California Press. pp. 177–192.
- Rompay, Lucas van (2008). "The East: Syria and Mesopotamia". The Oxford Handbook of Early Christian Studies. Oxford: Oxford University Press. pp. 365–386. ISBN 978-0-19-927156-6.
- Roussos, Sotiris (1998). "Diplomacy and Communal Identity: Greece and the Greek Orthodox in Syria and Lebanon, 1919-1940". Chronos: Revue d'Histoire de l'Université de Balamand. 1: 33–65.
- Roussos, Sotiris (2009). "Diaspora Politics, Ethnicity and the Orthodox Church in the Near East". Journal of Eastern Christian Studies. 61 (1–2): 137–148. doi:10.2143/JECS.61.1.2045833.
- Roussos, Sotiris (2010). "Eastern Orthodox Christianity in the Middle East". Eastern Christianity in the Modern Middle East. London-New York: Routledge. pp. 107–119. ISBN 978-1-135-19371-3.
- Roussos, Sotiris (2014). "Globalization Processes and Christians in the Middle East: A Comparative Analysis". The Journal of the Middle East and Africa. 5 (2): 111–130. doi:10.1080/21520844.2014.928924. S2CID 154336287.
- Walbiner, Carsten (1999). "Bishoprics and Bishops of the Greek Orthodox Patriarchate of Antioch in the 16th and 17th Centuries". تاريخ كنيسة أنطاكية للروم الأرثوذكس: أية خصوصية؟. طرابلس: منشورات جامعة البلمند. pp. 121–134.
- Walbiner, Carsten (2003). "The Split of the Greek Orthodox Patriarchate of Antioch (1724) and the Emergence of a New Identity in Bilâd al-Shâm as Reflected by some Melkite Historians of the 18th and Early 20th Centuries". Chronos: Revue d'Histoire de l'Université de Balamand. 7: 9–36.
- Winkler, Dietmar W. (2013). "Christianity in the Middle East: Some historical remarks and preliminary demographic figures". Syriac Christianity in the Middle East and India: Contributions and Challenges. Piscataway, NJ: Gorgias Press. pp. 107–125. doi:10.31826/9781463235864-011. ISBN 978-1-4632-3586-4.
