= Agapios of Antioch =

Agapios of Antioch may refer to:

- Agapios I of Antioch, patriarch (r. 953–959)
- Agapios II of Antioch, patriarch (r. 978–996)
