= John XIII =

John XIII may refer to:

- Pope John XIII, (r. 965–972)
- John XIII of Constantinople, Ecumenical Patriarch (r. 1315–1320)
- John XIII bar Ma'dani, Syriac Orthodox Patriarch of Antioch (r. 1483–1493)
- Pope John XIII of Alexandria, Coptic Orthodox Patriarch of Alexandria (r. 1483-1524)

== See also ==
- John 13, the thirteenth chapter of the Gospel of John
