= Patriarch John V =

Patriarch John V may refer to:

- Patriarch John V of Alexandria, Greek Patriarch of Alexandria in 610–619
- Patriarch John V of Constantinople, ruled in 669–675
- Patriarch John V of Antioch, a designation contended among various people; see John of Antioch
- John V, various Maronite Patriarchs
