= Patriarch John VII =

Patriarch John VII may refer to:

- John VII of Constantinople, Ecumenical Patriarch in 837–843
- John VII of Jerusalem, Patriarch of Jerusalem in 964–966
- Patriarch John VII of Antioch, a designation contended among various people; see John of Antioch
- John VII, various Maronite Patriarch (designation contended among various people)
