= Eustratios of Antioch =

Tenth-century Patriarch of Antioch

Patriarch Eustratios
- Bishop of Antioch
- Church: Greek Orthodox Church
- Installed: after 29 October 969
- Term ended: December 969
- Predecessor: Christopher of Antioch
- Successor: Theodore II of Antioch

Orders
- Consecration: Not enthroned

Personal details
- Residence: Flavias

Eustratios (Ancient Greek: Εὐστράτιος) was briefly Patriarch of Antioch in late 969. Appointed by Emperor Nikephoros II Phokas, Eustratios never formally assumed office or traveled to his see due to the emperor's assassination. He is a largely obscure figure in ecclesiastical history, omitted from most traditional patriarchal lists, and is known primarily through the late 12th-century text De translationibus episcoporum.

== Election to patriarch ==
Eustratios was the first recorded holder of the See of Antioch following the Roman reconquest of the city on October 29, 969. Emperor Nikephoros II Phokas required a patriarch he could trust to govern the newly recovered city and support his political ambitions in the East. He found this candidate in Eustratios, who was then the Bishop of Flavias, a diocese dependent on the Metropolis of Anazarbus.

To ensure Eustratios would be acceptable to the local population and to avoid the appearance of imposing a religious leader entirely foreign to their patriarchate, Nikephoros II issued a chrysobull. This imperial decree detached the see of Flavias from the Metropolis of Anazarbus and attached it directly to the Patriarchate of Antioch, subsequently elevating Eustratios to the patriarchal throne. Eustratios was likely elevated between mid-November and early December 969.

=== Eastern Roman ecclesiastical policy ===
The elevation of Eustratios and the transfer of Flavias provide rare insight into Roman ecclesiastical policy regarding reconquered territories in the 10th century. The chrysobull reveals that in 969, Anazarbus—and by extension the wider region of Cilicia, which had been conquered between 962 and 965—did not belong to the Patriarchate of Antioch, but rather to the Ecumenical Patriarchate of Constantinople.

Eastern Roman imperial practice dictated that newly conquered territories were temporarily subjected to the Patriarchate of Constantinople until the original patriarchal see was recovered. It is highly probable that Nikephoros II's initial intention was to keep the newly conquered Cilicia, much like neighboring Isauria, under the jurisdiction of Constantinople. The detachment of Flavias was likely a localized, pragmatic exception designed to secure a loyal patriarch in Antioch without immediately disrupting the broader ecclesiastical boundaries of the region. This practice of subjecting reconquered lands to Constantinople is corroborated by other contemporary examples, such as the temporary subjection of Cyprus (recovered in 961) and the prolonged attachment of Mesopotamian Armenia (with Arsamosata as its metropolis) to Constantinople.

=== Deposition ===
Eustratios's tenure as patriarch-elect was cut short by political upheaval. Before he could travel to Antioch or be formally enthroned, Nikephoros II Phokas was assassinated by conspirators on the night of December 10–11, 969.

Because Eustratios had not yet been enthroned, it was easy for the new regime to set aside the late emperor's uncrowned candidate. He was likely bypassed and forced to return to his former title as Bishop of Flavias. The separation of Flavias from Anazarbus, now devoid of its original political purpose, was presumably never realized.

== Legacy ==
Due to his failure to take physical possession of the see, Eustratios remained entirely unknown to contemporary and near-contemporary historians such as Yahya of Antioch and Nikon of the Black Mountain. Both authors present Theodore II as the successor to Christopher and the first legitimate patriarch of Antioch following the Byzantine reconquest. Nevertheless, he held the right to be included in patriarchal lists, having been canonically elected and having borne the title, even if only for a matter of days.
