= Patriarch John VI =

Patriarch John VI may refer to:

- Patriarch John VI of Constantinople, ruled in 712–715
- Patriarch John VI of Alexandria, Greek Patriarch of Alexandria in 1062–1100
- Patriarch John VI of Antioch, a designation contended among various people; see John of Antioch
- John VI, various Maronite Patriarchs
