= Church of Cassian =

Former Cathedral of Antioch, also known as St. Peter

Church of Cassian / Church of St. Peter
- Church of Cassian / Church of St. Peter
- 36°12′09″N 36°09′38″E
- Location: Antioch
- Country: Roman Empire
- Denomination: Syriac Orthodox, Greek Orthodox, Latin Church

History
- Status: Cathedral

Architecture
- Architectural type: Church
- Completed: possibly 459

Specifications
- Length: 100 paces
- Width: 80 paces

The Church of Cassian (Arabic: القسيان), also called the Church of St. Peter (gr. Hagios Petros), was the Cathedral church of Patriarch of Antioch during late antiquity and the Middle Ages. The church is not to be mistaken with the cave church called St. Peter.

A version of the Holy Lance was found in the treasury of the cathedral in 1098, by the forces of the First Crusade. In 1190, the cathedral became the burial place of Frederick Barbarossa. In 1268, the cathedral was burned by Baybars during his sack of Antioch.

== History ==
=== Origins ===
According to the famous Christian Arab Ibn Butlan, the church was the house of a man called Cassianus, a prince of Antioch, whose son the apostle Peter had resurrected. It is possible that Cassianus refers to an actual governor. The Arab historian Al-Masudi dates the church to 459 though his source is unknown.

The first mention of the church is in a homily preached by Severus, Patriarch of Antioch, on 22 February 513. The Syrian chronicler John Malalas recounts that emperor Justinian donated a jewelled toga to the inhabitants of Antioch which was then displayed in the church of St Cassian. According to John of Ephesus, the bishops Sergius and George attempted to consecrate an alternative patriarch in the church. This points to how the church became one of the important churches in Antioch in the late sixth century. At the same time, the old cathedral church, the so-called Domus Aurea was destroyed by an earthquake in 588.

=== During Arabic occupation ===
The church of Cassian became latest by the time of the Arab occupation the most important church of Antioch and the 17th century patriarch Macarius III Ibn al-Za'im described the church of Cassian as the patriarchal church between the fall of Antioch to the Arabs in 638 and the destruction of Antioch in 1268 by the Mamluks. During the Arabic occupation, Antioch remained the most important Melkite center in Northern Syria and the Christians remained in possession of the church of Cassian as well as the round Church of Saint Mary, possibly due to a comparatively low Muslim population. The Byzantine rebel Thomas the Slav was crowned emperor by patriarch Hiob on order of caliph Al-Ma'mun in 821. In 967, the local Muslims killed patriarch Christopher and sacked the church and the nearby cell of the patriarch.

=== During the Byzantine reconquest ===
Antioch was reconquered by the Byzantine Empire in the year 969 through the strategos Michael Bourtzes and his comrade Isaak Brachamios. Soon after that, many churches and monasteries in the region such as that of Saint Symeon were reconstructed, something that had been forbidden under Islamic law. The church of Cassian, now referred to as Hagios Petros (i.e. St. Peter), was also reconstructed after the Hagia Sophia by Patriarch John III Polites who was ordered to do so by Emperor Basil II. When Ibn Butlan visited and lived in the church in the middle of the 11th century, the church had many servants and administrators. When Antioch fell to Suleiman ibn Qutalmish in 1084, he plundered it and made the church into a mosque.

=== During the Principality of Antioch ===
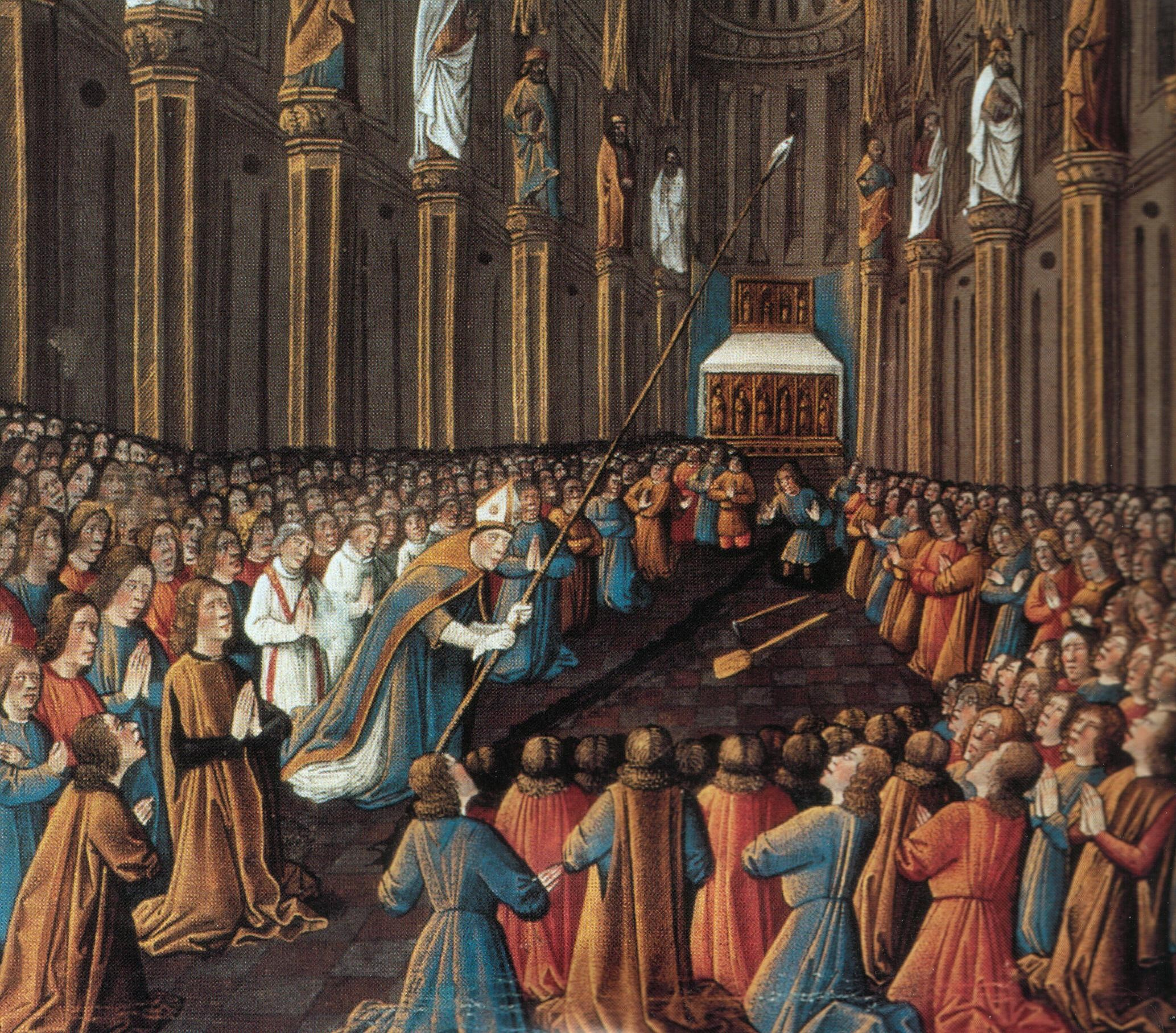
Discovery of the Holy Lance in the Passages d'outremer

In 1098, the forces of the First Crusade expelled the Turks and found the statues of saints in the church covered with cement. They were convinced that it still contained St. Peter's chair and the narthex became again a burial ground. It was also here that the crusaders found what some of them thought to be the Holy Lance which might have been crucial in boosting their morale. According to the biography of the murdered patriarch Christopher, the lance had been one of the relics in the treasury of the cathedral. The papal legate Adhemar of Le Puy, spiritual leader of the crusaders, was buried in the church upon his death in August 1098.

Under the regency of Tancred, the Melkite patriarch John the Oxite was expelled and the cathedral became the center of the Latin patriarch of Antioch. The Latin patriarch Aimery of Limoges installed the Miaphysite patriarch Michael I in this church. In 1165, Bohemond III of Antioch was forced to seek aid from the Byzantine Emperor Manuel Komnenos and in exchange was forced to return the church to the Greek patriarch Athanasios I. Five years later, on June 29, 1170, a major earthquake hit the cathedral, causing the dome to collapse and killing about 50 congregants as well as Athanasios I. The Holy Roman Emperor Frederick Barbarossa was buried in the church in 1190, though his bones were later brought to Jerusalem. It seems that the cathedral was finally burned together with the church of St. Paul when Baybars sacked the city in 1268.

== Description ==
Whereas the old cathedral had been octagonal and very large, the church of Cassianus was basilical and located in the heart of Antioch. It was a rectangular structure, 100 paces by 80 paces and rested on undercroft. The church was famous for being built of marble and the geographer Ibn al-Faqih al-Hamadhani mentioned it as the best building done in marble. Ibn Butlan, who later died as a monk in Antioch, wrote a detailed description of the Church. Among other things, he describes a clepshydra at one of the gates of the cathedral showing the hours of the day during day and night and a bimaristan where the patriarch himself cared for the sick and lepers. Ibn Butlan wrote that the church held a relic of John the Baptist (the right hand and possibly arm) which was then smuggled to Chalcedon by Patriarch Hiob and then in 957 to the palace of Constantine VII in Constantinople.

According to the 17th century traveller Jean de la Roque the Christians of Antioch were still able to see the ruins of the church of Cassian though he thought them to be those of the Domus Aurea. It is possible that some of the marble used in the sixteenth century madrasa of Sibay in Damascus includes material from the church of Cassian.

== Location ==
According to Ottoman sources and local traditions, the present-day mosque of Habib Neccar was known in the crusader period as "El Kosyan" (Kasyana) church. This, together with descriptions of the location by Ibn Butlan as well as the Arabic legends from the 12th to 14th century about an alleged associate of St. Peter called Habib the carpenter, could point to the Habib mosque standing on the same ground as the church of Cassian. However, this identification conflicts with records of Yaqut al-Rumi who mentions a distinct shrine of Habib as a place of Muslim pilgrimage at the beginning of the thirteenth century when Antioch was under Frankish rule.

== Sources ==
- Brundage, James A. (1959). "Adhemar of Puy: The Bishop and His Critics". Speculum. 34 (2): 201–212. doi:10.2307/2853164. JSTOR 2853164.
- Giorgi, Andrea U. De; Eger, A. Asa (2021). Antioch: A History. Routledge. ISBN 978-1-317-54041-0.
- Kennedy, Hugh N. (2006). The Byzantine and Early Islamic Near East. Ashgate Publishing, Ltd. pp. 64, 187–188, 191. ISBN 978-0-7546-5909-9.
- Mayer, Wendy; Allen, Pauline (2012). The churches of Syrian Antioch (300–638 CE). Leuven. pp. 52–55. ISBN 978-90-429-2604-2.
- Morton, Nicholas (2016). Encountering Islam on the First Crusade. Cambridge University Press. p. 120. ISBN 978-1-107-15689-0.
- Necipoğlu, Gülru; Leal, Karen A. (2009). Muqarnas. Brill. ISBN 978-90-04-17589-1.
- Todt, Klaus-Peter (2004). "Antioch in the Middle Byzantine period (969–1084) : the reconstruction of the city as an administrative, economic, military and ecclesiastical center". Topoi. Orient-Occident. 5 (1): 171–190.
- Ciggaar, Krijna Nelly; Metcalf, David Michael (2006). East and West in the Medieval Eastern Mediterranean: Antioch from the Byzantine Reconquest Until the End of the Crusader Principality. Peeters Publishers. p. 100. ISBN 978-90-429-1735-4.
