= Church of Saint Peter =

Church near Antakya (Antioch), Turkey

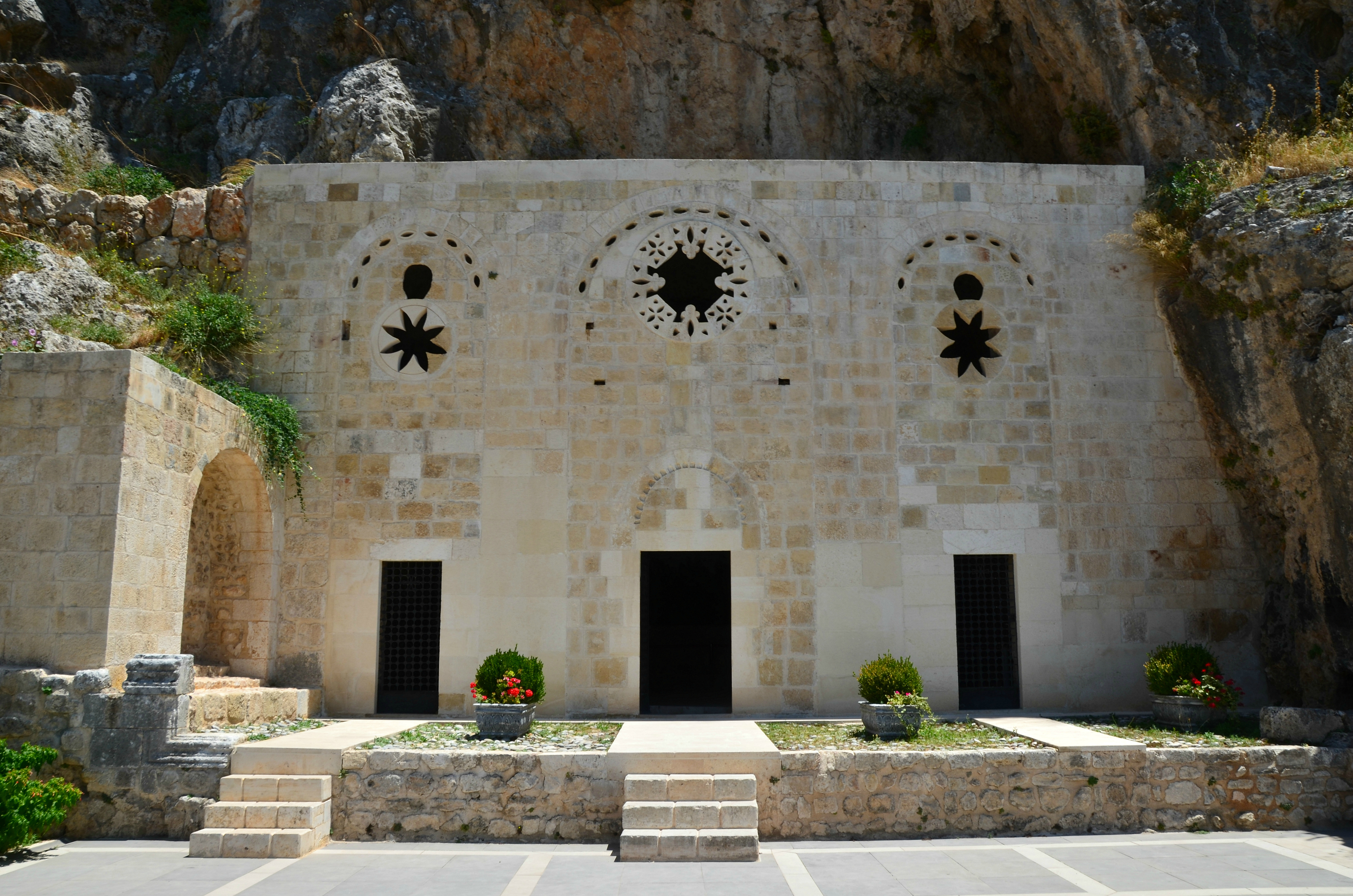
- Church of Saint Peter
- Church of Saint Peter
- 36°12′34″N 36°10′42″E
- Location: Antakya, Hatay
- Country: Turkey
- Denomination: Oriental Orthodox Church: Syriac Orthodox Church of Antioch
- Tradition: West Syriac Rite

History
- Founder: Apostles as per tradition
- Dedication: Saint Peter

Architecture
- Functional status: Church Museum

Specifications
- Width: 9.5 m (31 ft)
- Height: 7 m (23 ft)

The Church of Saint Peter (also known as St. Peter's Cave Church and Cave-Church of St. Peter; Classical Syriac: 'ito d Mor Shem'un Kifo (romanization); Turkish: Aziz Petrus Kilisesi) near Antakya (Antioch), is composed of a cave carved into the mountainside on Mount Starius with a depth of 13 m (42 ft.), a width of 9.5 m (31 ft.) and a height of 7 m (23 ft). The church is not to be mistaken with the former cathedral of Antioch, the church of Cassian which was also called church of St. Peter.

== History ==
There is no reliable data to date the construction of the church though it is believed that St. Peter preached and laid the foundation for the Christian church of Antioch. The oldest surviving parts of the church building date from at least the 4th or 5th century; these include some pieces of floor mosaics, and traces of frescoes on the right side of the altar. The tunnel inside which opens to the mountainside is thought to have served the Christians for evacuation of the church in case of sudden raids and attacks. Water which seeps from the nearby rocks was gathered inside to drink and to use for baptism; the flow of this water, which visitors drank and collected to give to those who were ill (believing that it was healing and curative), has lessened as a result of recent earthquakes. St. Paul is believed to have been baptised here and the water was sought not only by Christians but also Alawites who attributed to the water a beneficent healing virtue.

The church has been also called St. John's grotto, possibly because of John Chrysostom who is believed to have given sermons and performed baptisms here. The side is also identified as such by Wilbrand of Oldenburg who visited it in 1211 and said that it was built over the house of St. Luke the Evangelist.

Crusaders of the First Crusade who captured Antakya in 1098 lengthened the church by a few meters and connected it with two arches to the facade, which they constructed. Acting on orders from Pope Pius IX, Capuchin Friars restored the church and rebuilt the facade in 1863; French Emperor Napoleon III contributed to the restoration. The remains to the left of the entrance belong to colonnades which formerly stood in front of the present facade.

Atop the stone altar in the middle of the church is a stonework platform placed in memory of Saint Peter's Platform Holiday, which was celebrated every 21 February in Antakya. A marble statue of Saint Peter was placed above the altar in 1932.

The garden of the church has been used as a cemetery for hundreds of years. Graves and burials have also been located inside the church, especially around the altar. In the vicinity was also the relics of St Ignatius, the first bishop of Antioch.

The church is a museum today, but it is possible to perform worship services inside the church under the inspection of the Museum Management by obtaining a permit from the Office of the Provincial Governor. The church underwent restoration in 2013, with plans including repairs on the rock, construction of a service building and attempts to uncover fourth to fifth-century mosaics from the church's earliest period.

== Gallery ==
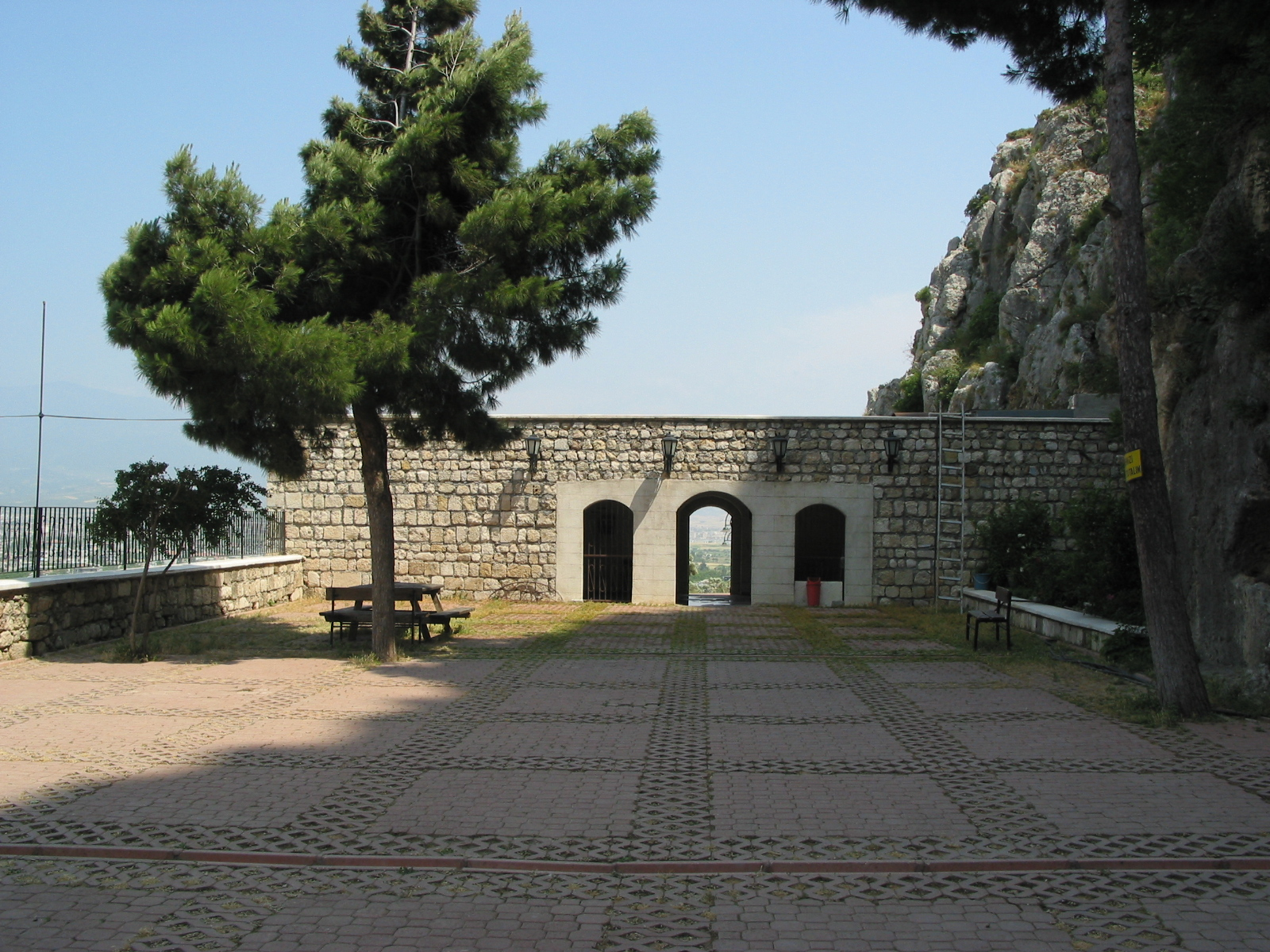
Churchyard

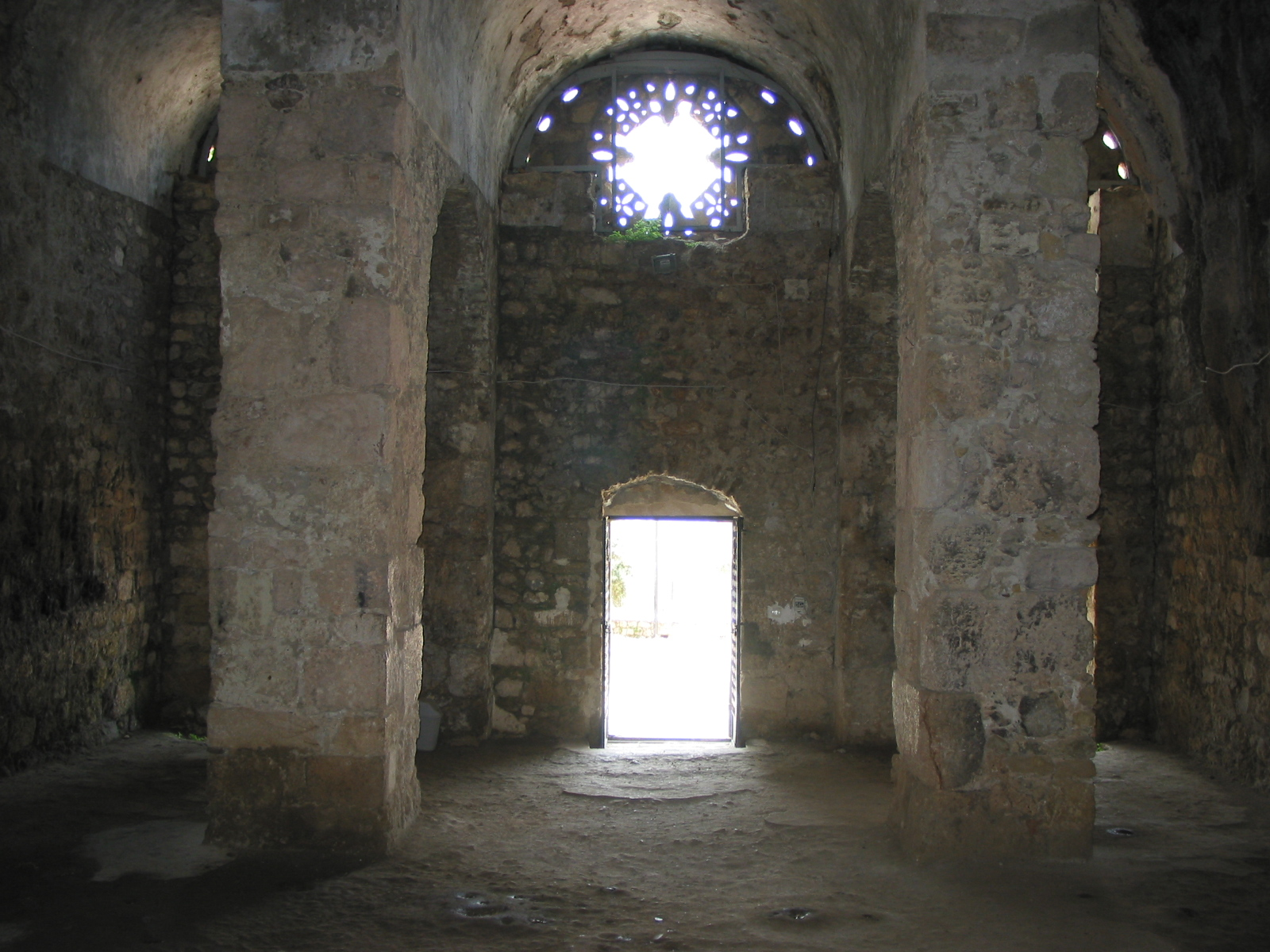
Church interior

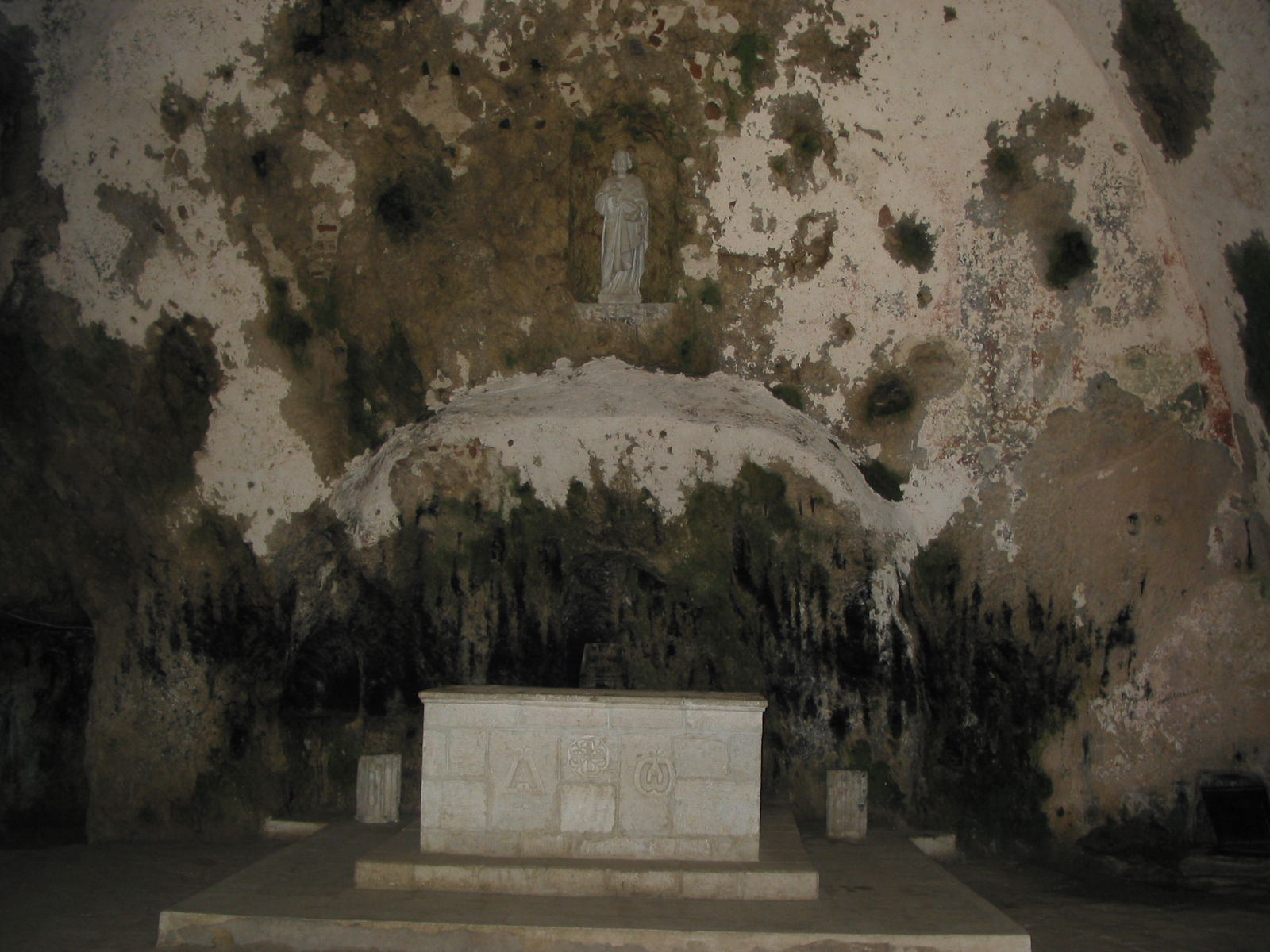
Altar

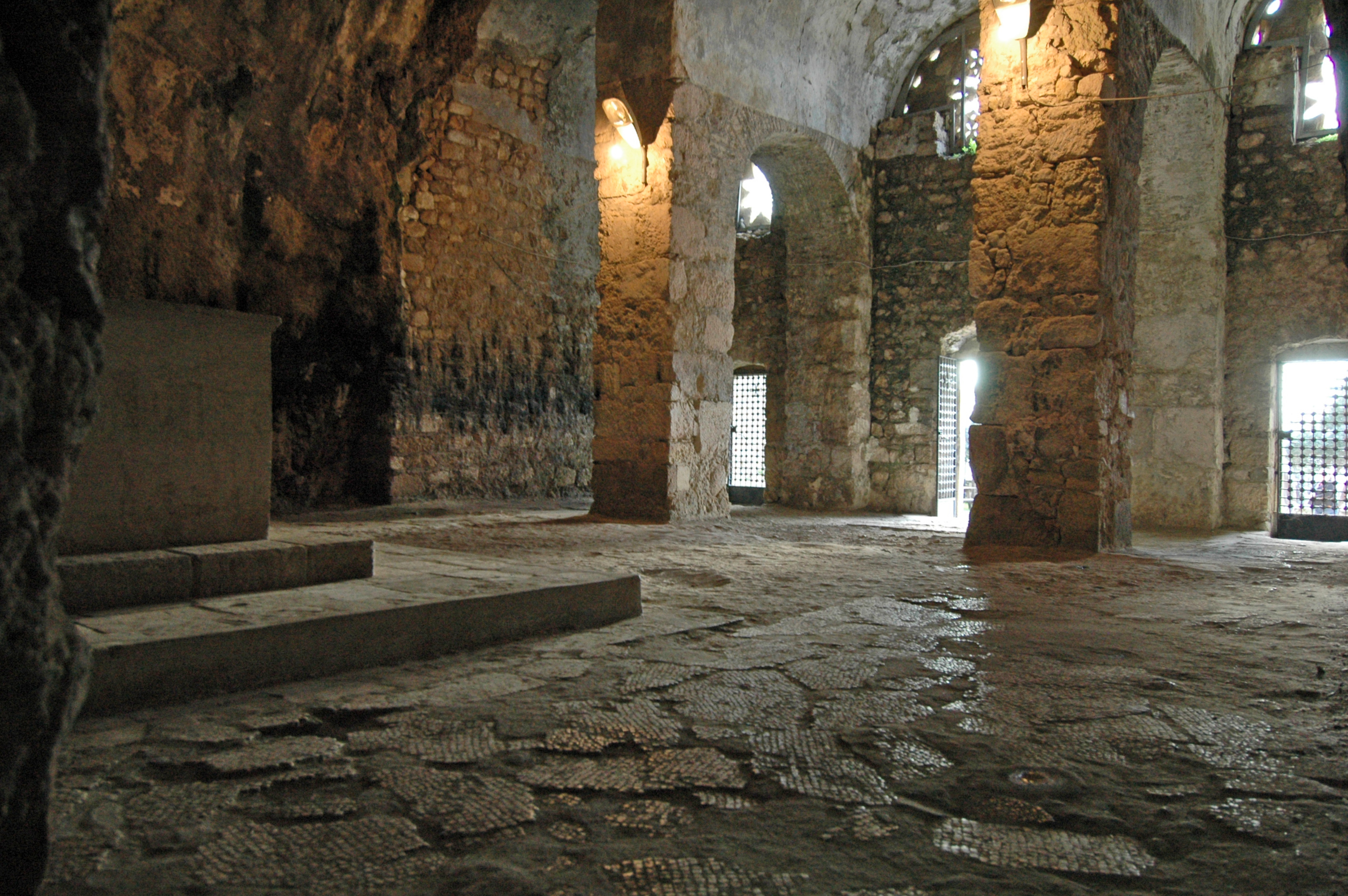
St Peter's Cave Church Interior

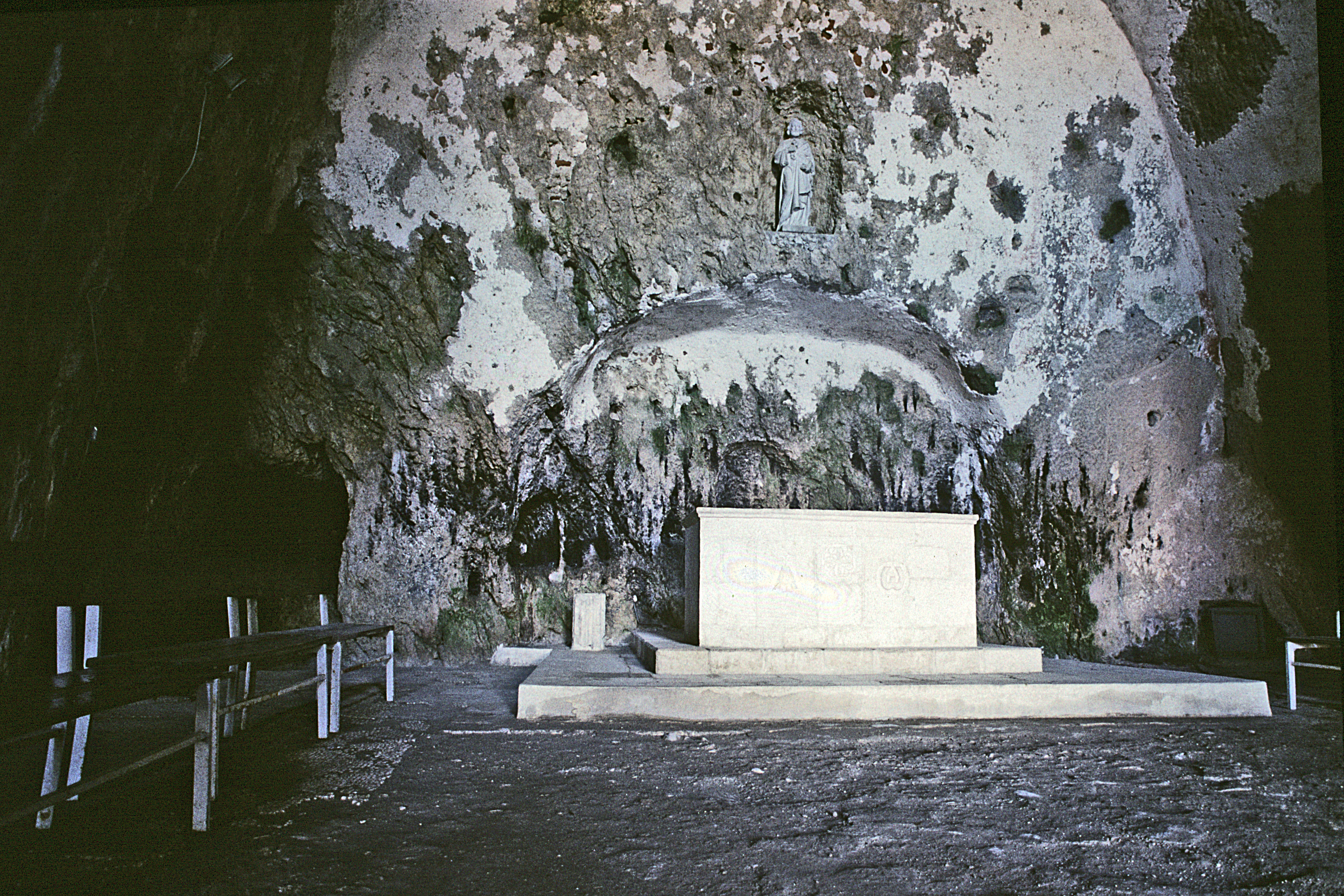
St Peter's Cave Church Altar area

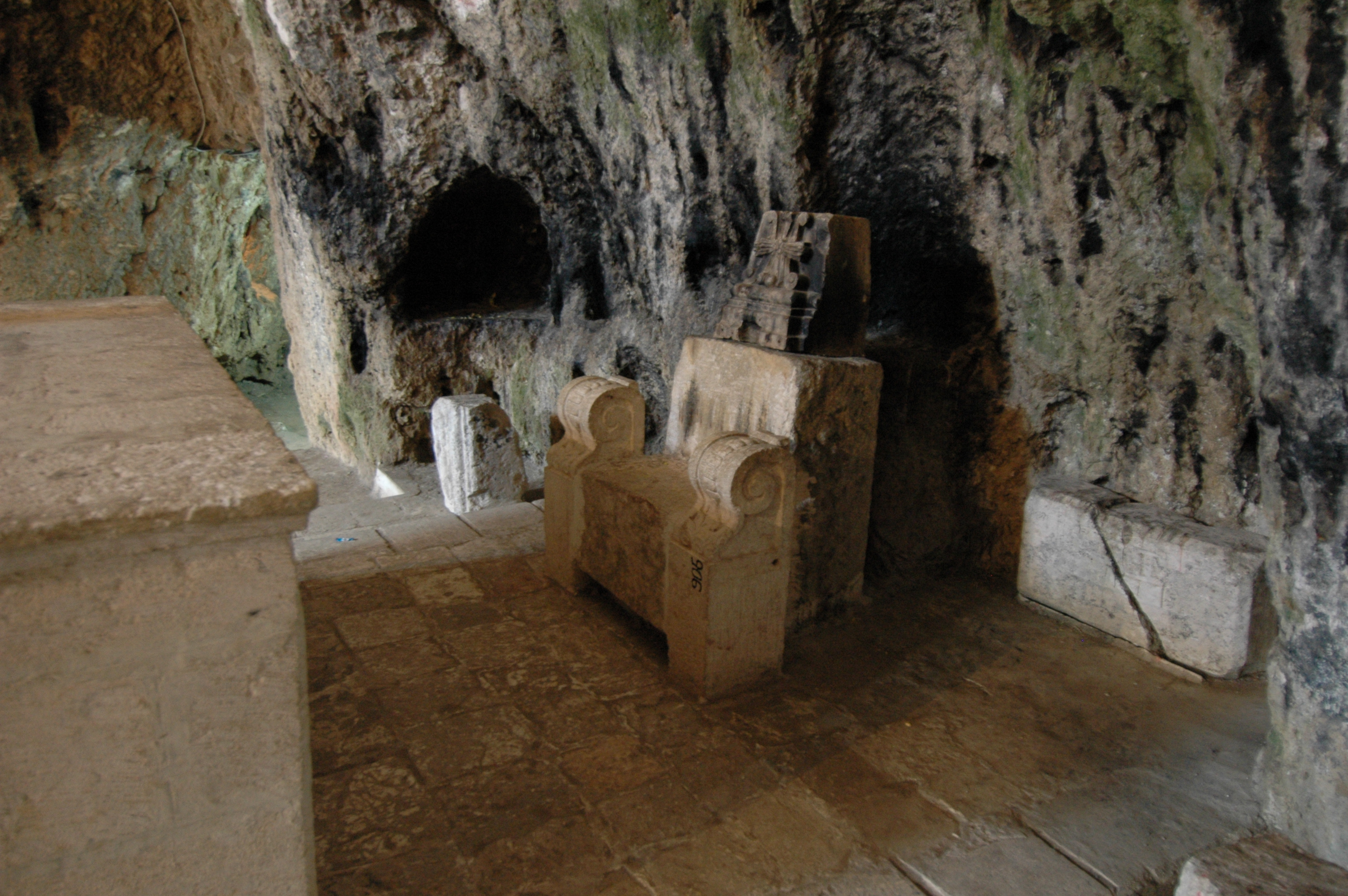
St Peter's Cave Church Facade

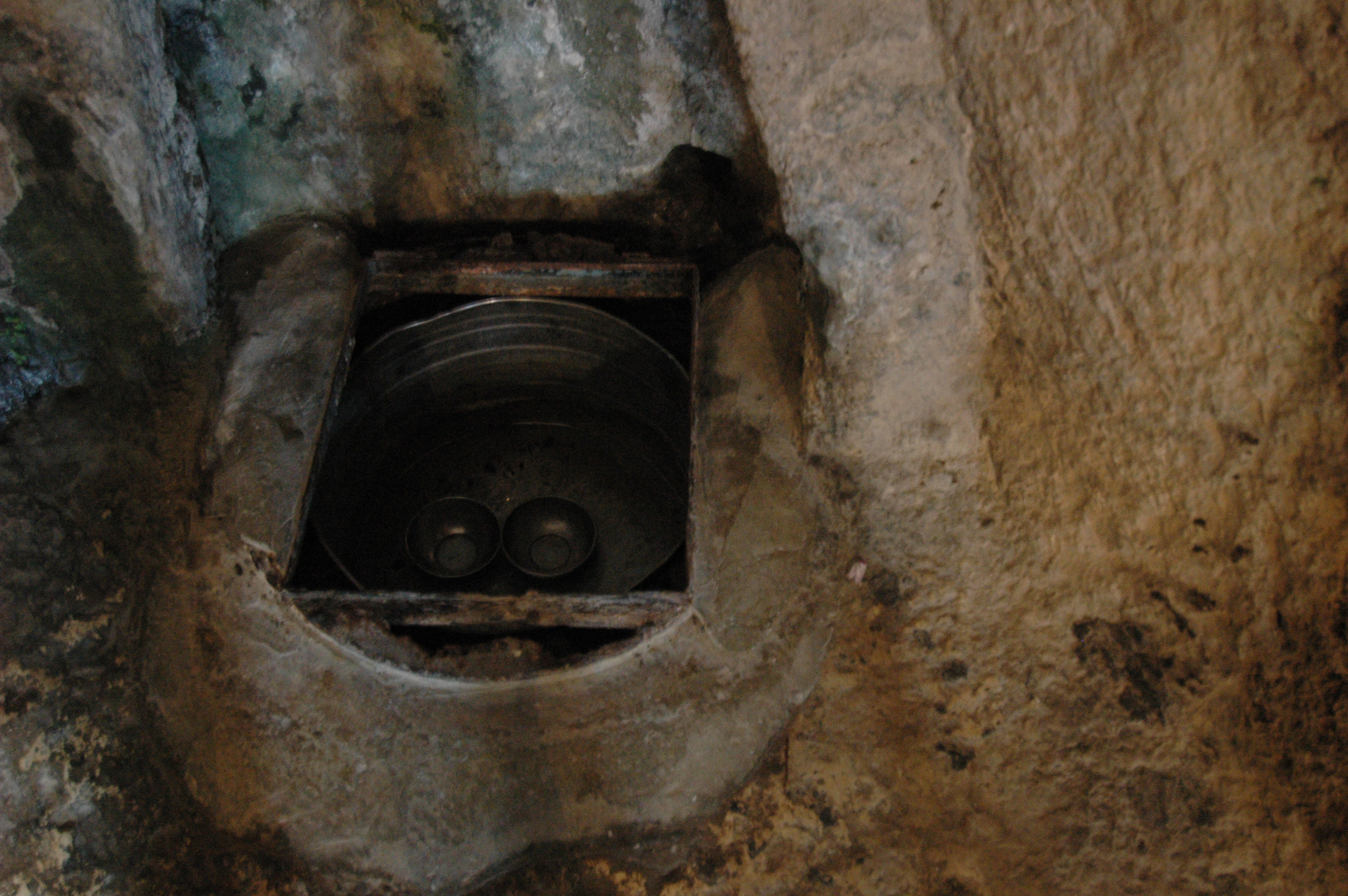
St Peter's Cave Church Entrance tunnel

== See also ==
- Oldest churches in the world
