= Ignatius III David =

82nd Patriarch of Syriac Orthodox Church of Antioch

- Syriac Orthodox Patriarch of Antioch and All the East
- Church: Syriac Orthodox Church
- See: Antioch
- Installed: 1222
- Term ended: 1252
- Predecessor: John XII
- Successor: John XIII bar Maʿdani

Personal details
- Died: June 1252

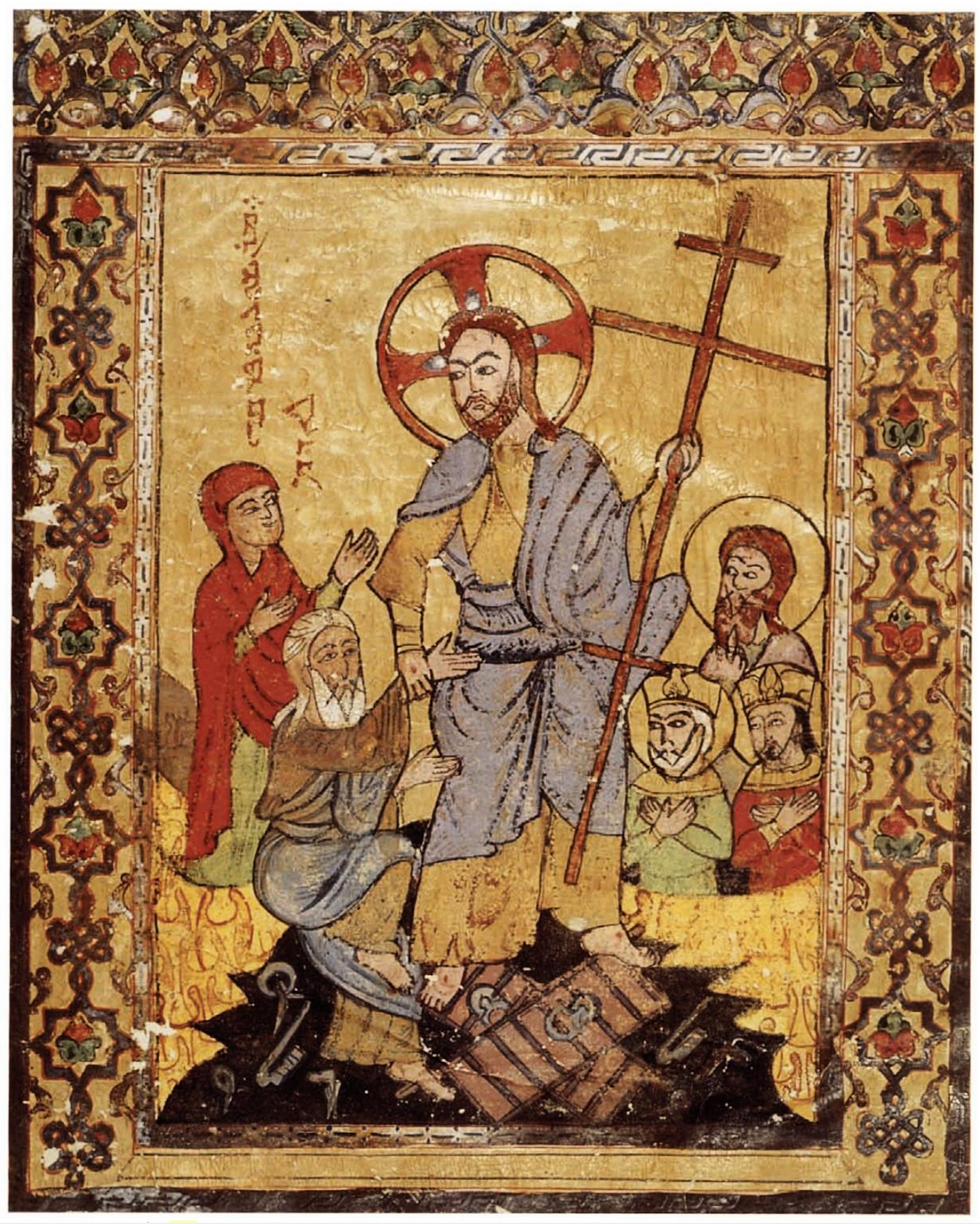
Syriac Gospels, British Library, Add. 7170 was completed at the time of Ignatius III David as maphrian (1215-1222). Christ resurrected.

Ignatius III David was the Patriarch of Antioch and head of the Syriac Orthodox Church from 1222 until 1252.

== Biography ==
In 1215, David was ordained maphrian by John XII upon which he took the name Ignatius and was maphrian for seven years before being consecrated patriarch in 1222, which was also the year he ordained Mor Dionysius Sleeba as maphrian. A diplomatic mission carried out by David and the Armenian Catholicos Constantine I of Cilicia in 1225 attempted to end hostilities between Isabella, Queen of Armenia and the usurper Constantine of Baberon.

In 1232, David ordained the future patriarch John V bar Maʿdani as maphrian. The former maphrian, Ignatius Sleeba III of Edessa, after having retired and became a physician, is known to have treated David, who suffered from gout.

During David's tenure as patriarch, a dispute arose between the Syriac Orthodox Church and Pope Cyril III of Alexandria of the Coptic Orthodox Church, who, in 1237, had taken advantage of the military strength of the Ayyubid Sultanate to appoint a Coptic bishop of Jerusalem. The new bishop was granted jurisdiction over Ayyubid and crusader territories in Syria and Palestine, an area traditionally within the jurisdiction of the Syriac Orthodox Church and thus created friction between the churches. Simultaneously, David was approached by an Ethiopian faction within the Coptic Orthodox Church and asked to ordain an Ethiopian as an abuna, the head of the church in Ethiopia. He discussed the issue with the newly arrived Dominicans who offered to mediate the dispute and forbade the appointment of an abuna, however, David spurned the Dominicans' offer and ordained a new abuna. Upon hearing of the appointment of a new abuna, the Dominicans incited the Templar and Hospitaller knights to meet with David and demand an explanation.

This was a very rare incident between the two churches as in general their relationship is one of the strongest between any two churches.

In the closing years of his tenure as patriarch, David entered a quarrel with the metropolitan bishop Dionysius Angur of Melitene.

== See also ==
- Opizzo Fieschi, nephew of Innocent IV and Latin Patriarch of Antioch during Ignatius III's tenure

== Sources ==
- Snelders, B. (2010). Identity and Christian-Muslim interaction : medieval art of the Syrian Orthodox from the Mosul area. Peeters, Leuven.

Preceded by John XII	Syriac Orthodox Patriarch of Antioch; 1222–1252	Succeeded by John XIII bar Maʿdani
