= Theodore II of Antioch =

Tenth-century Patriarch of Antioch

Patriarch Theodore II
- Bishop of Antioch
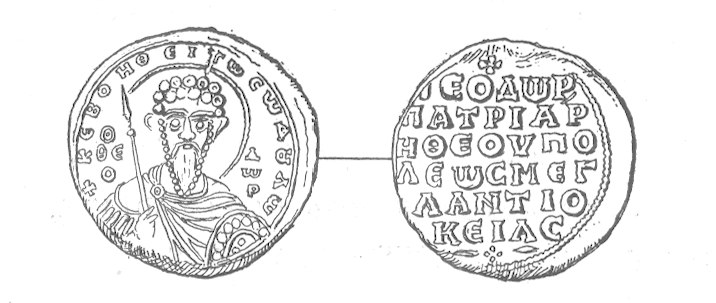
- Seal of Theodore II (Theodore of Koloneia)
- Church: Greek Orthodox Church
- Installed: 23 January 970
- Term ended: 28 May 976
- Predecessor: Eustratios
- Successor: Agapios II

Personal details
- Born: Antonios Koloneia on the Lykos
- Died: 28 May 976 Tarsos
- Residence: Antioch

Theodore II (Ancient Greek: Θεόδωρος, died 28 May 976) was the Greek Orthodox Patriarch of Antioch from 23 January 970 until his death in 976. Appointed by Emperor John I Tzimiskes, Theodore's patriarchate was marked by the restoration of patriarchal rights in Antioch following the Roman reconquest, as well as his involvement in the political turmoil of the early reign of Basil II.

== Biography ==
=== Early life and appointment ===
Theodore was a native of Koloneia in Pontus. He founded and served as the hegumen (abbot) of the monastery of Kyros Antonios in the Armeniac Theme in or near Neokaisareia. He was known as a holy man who, according to tradition, had predicted the rise to the imperial throne for both Nikephoros II Phokas and his successor, John I Tzimiskes. Following his ascension, Emperor Tzimiskes selected Theodore for the patriarchal see of Antioch. Constantinople asserted its authority over the appointment, reserving the right to consecrate him; before the ceremony, Theodore was subjected to a formal examination by the synod to verify his capacity for the office. He was officially consecrated as Patriarch on 23 January 970, correcting earlier historiographical claims by C. Korolevsky that placed the event on 24 January.

=== Patriarchate and privileges ===
During his patriarchate, Emperor John I Tzimiskes issued a chrysobull restoring the patriarchal rights over all churches and monasteries in Antioch and its surrounding regions, in accordance with ecclesiastical canons and civil laws. These rights had been suspended during the period of Muslim domination.Furthermore, the emperor designated the Monastery of Our Lady of the Hodigitria in Constantinople as the official residence for the Patriarchs of Antioch during their stays in the capital. The Ecumenical Patriarch, Polyeuctus of Constantinople, granted Theodore additional privileges, including the right to celebrate the Divine Liturgy, perform ordinations, and claim the right to the anaphora in all metochions (dependencies) held in Constantinople or within his jurisdiction. Theodore also successfully petitioned John Tzimiskes to transfer the Paulicians of the Patriarchate of Antioch to Thrace.

=== Political involvement and death ===
Theodore's position as Patriarch of Antioch carried significant political weight. At the outset of the rebellion of Bardas Skleros, Emperor Basil II, the successor of John Tzimiskes, urgently summoned Theodore to Constantinople. The summons was likely intended to prevent the patriarch from supporting the rebel and to ascertain the political disposition of Antioch. An imperial chelandion (transport ship) was provided for his journey. Although Theodore set out while ill, his condition worsened, forcing him to disembark at Tarsus, where he died on 28 May 976. Following his death, there was a two-year vacancy until his successor, Agapius of Antioch was consecrated.
