= Ibrahim ibn Yuhanna =

Byzantine Bureaucrat, Translator, and Author

- Born: c. 950s likely Antioch, Hamdanid emirate of Aleppo (modern-day Antakya, Hatay, Turkey)
- Died: c. 1030s likely Antioch, Byzantine Empire (modern-day Antakya, Hatay, Turkey)

Academic work
- Main interests: Translation, Religion
- Notable works: Life of Christopher

Ibrahim ibn Yuhanna (Arabic: إبراهيم بن يوحنا) was a Byzantine bureaucrat, translator, and author from Antioch in the late 10th and early 11th centuries. He held the title of protospatharios and is often identified by this title in Arabic sources. Little is known for certain about his life, but he recounts in the Life of Christopher that he was a child in Antioch in the time of Patriarch Christopher and just before, meaning the late 950s and early 960s. He evidently found success in the imperial bureaucracy after the Byzantines conquered Antioch in 969, given his elevated title. The Life describes events in the time of Patriarch Nicholas II (1025–1030), so Ibrahim must have lived at least to the very late 1020s.

The Life of Christopher is the only extant work authored by Ibrahim. It was originally composed in both Greek and Arabic, but only the Arabic version survives. On the other hand, it seems that the bulk of Ibrahim's scholarly work was devoted to Arabic translations of Greek theological texts. He is known to have translated homilies by Basil of Caesarea, Gregory of Nazianzus, Gregory of Nyssa, and John Chrysostom; a portion of the Divine Names of Pseudo-Dionysius the Areopagite; and panegyrics for the evangelists Luke and John from the Menologion of his contemporary Symeon the Metaphrast. He may also have been involved in administering imperial efforts to translate the Constantinopolitan liturgy into Syriac for use in the Greek Orthodox Church of Antioch, as indicated by a reference to "Abraham the king's scribe" in a 1056 Syriac Triodion manuscript in the British Library (BL Or. 8607). However, there is no evidence that Ibrahim himself translated any texts into Syriac.
