= Syriac Gospels, Vatican Library, Syr. 559 =

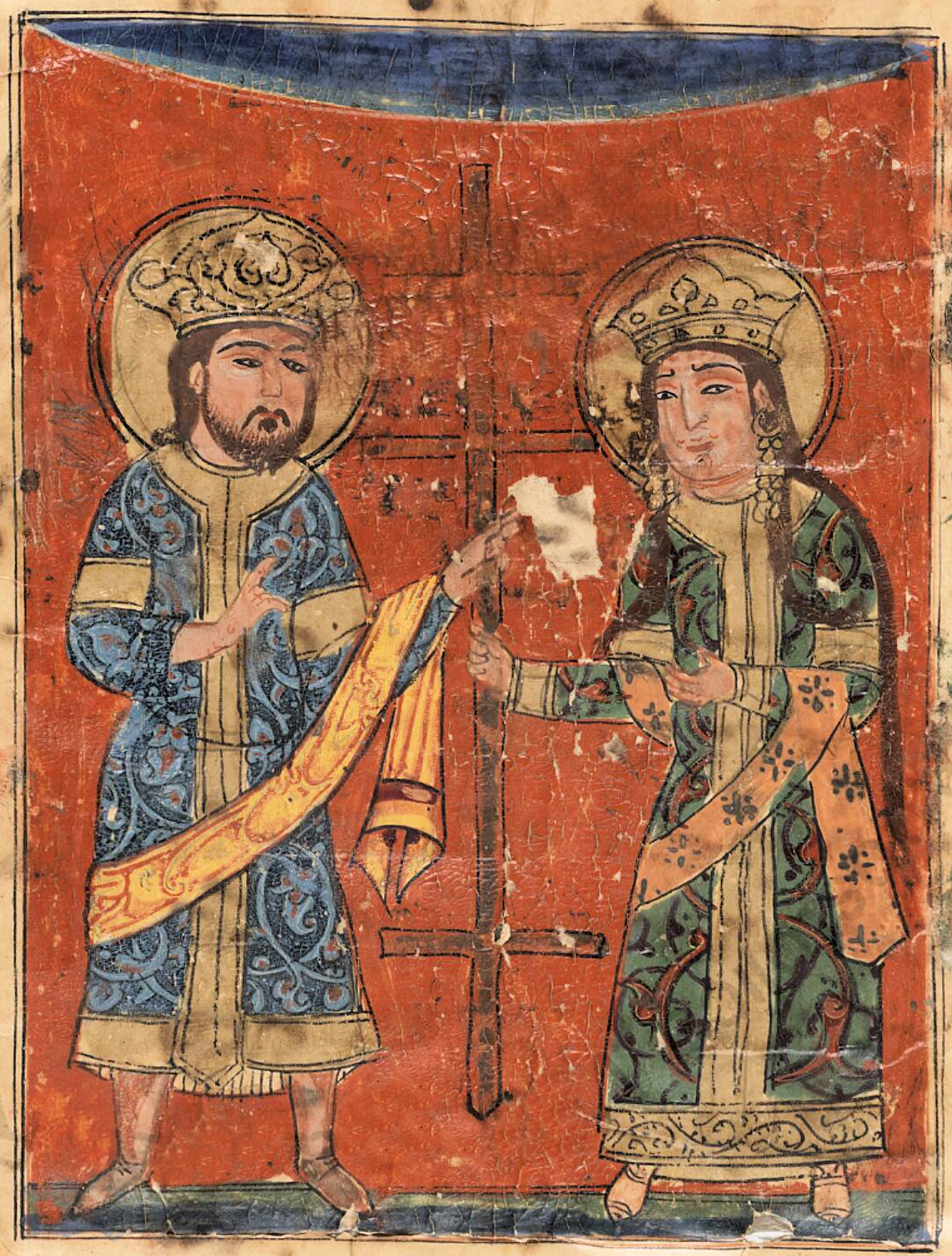
Constantine and Helen with Seljuk crowns, and Near-Eastern clothing with tiraz bands.

Vatican Library, Syr. 559 is a Syriac manuscript produced around 1220. It is an evangeliary containing the text of the Peshitta. It is one of the few well illustrated Middle Eastern Christian manuscripts from the 13th century.

There is some dispute about the reading of the date, some scholars arguing for 1220, while others argue for 1260.

The location where the manuscript was created is the Jazira region near Mosul, at the monastery of Deir Mar Mattai.

The writing is in Estrangela script. It is considered as a near twin of Syriac Gospels, British Library, Add. 7170 manuscript, also attributed to northern Iraq (Jazira region).

The manuscript is derived from the Byzantine tradition, but stylistically has a lot in common with Islamic illustrated manuscripts such as the Maqamat al-Hariri, pointing to a common pictorial tradition that existed since circa 1180 CE in Syria and Iraq. Some of the illustrations of these manuscript have been characterized as "illustration byzantine traitée à la manière arabe" ("Byzantine illustration treated in the Arab style").

Notably, Constantine and Helena are shown in post-Seljuk clothing, a style attributable to the influence of local Turkic polities.

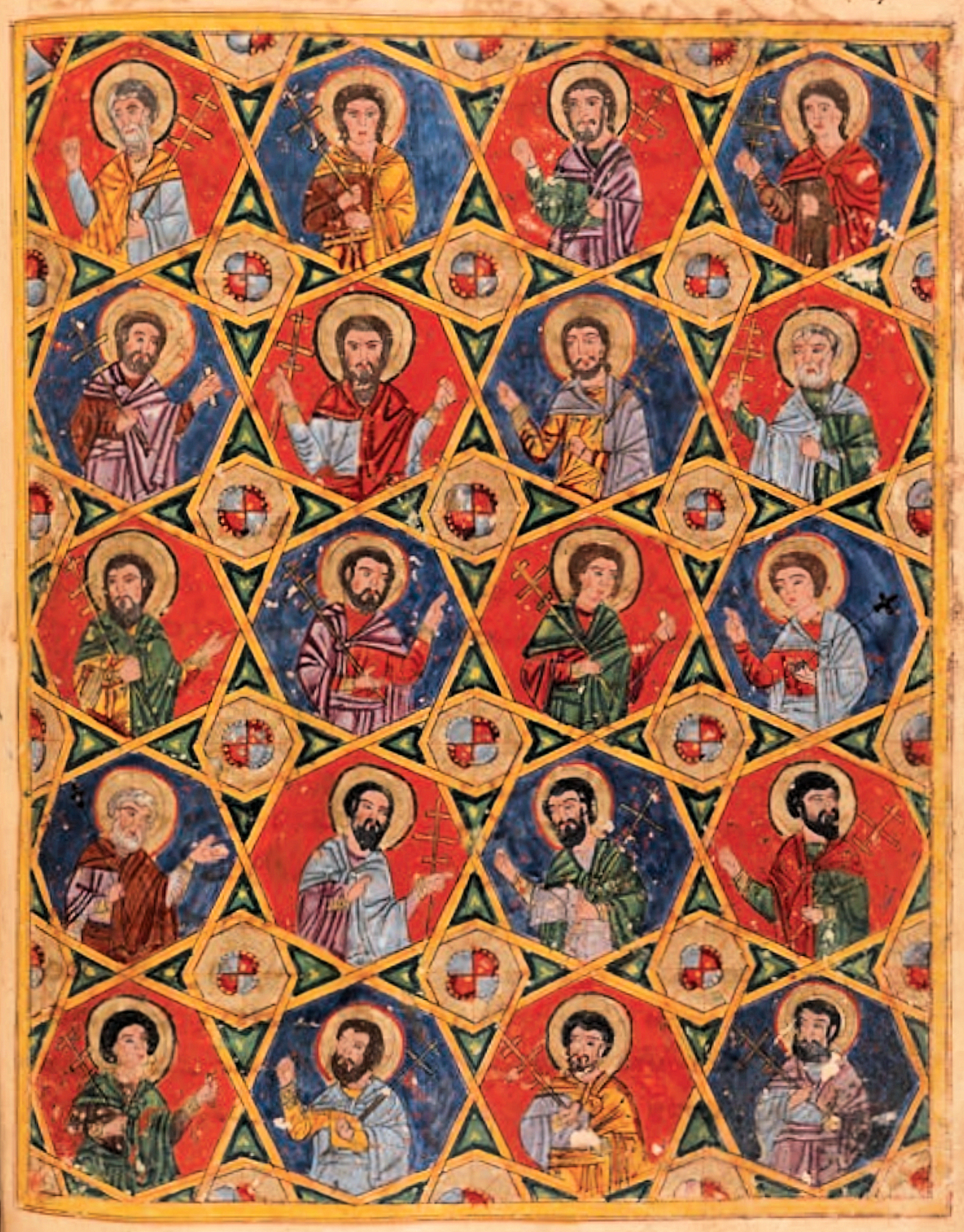
Twenty of the Forty Martyrs of Sebaste

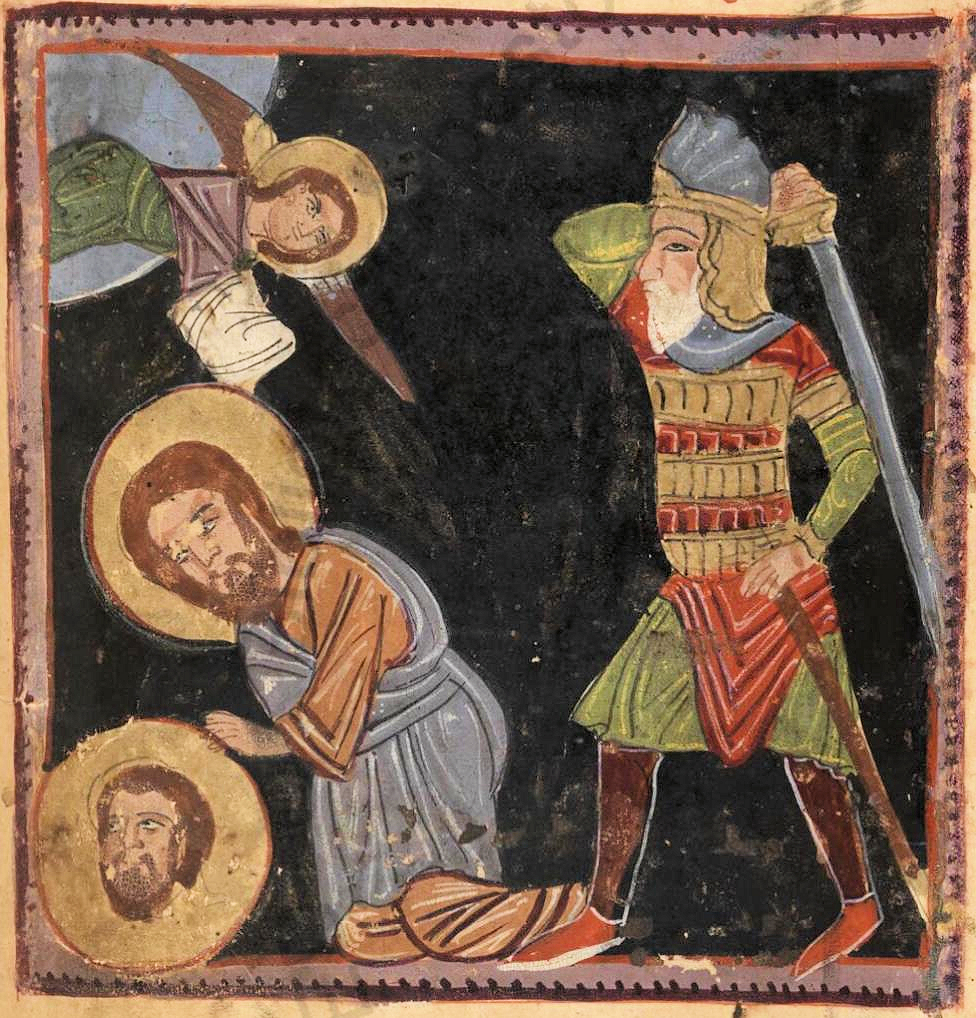
Beheading of John the Baptist.

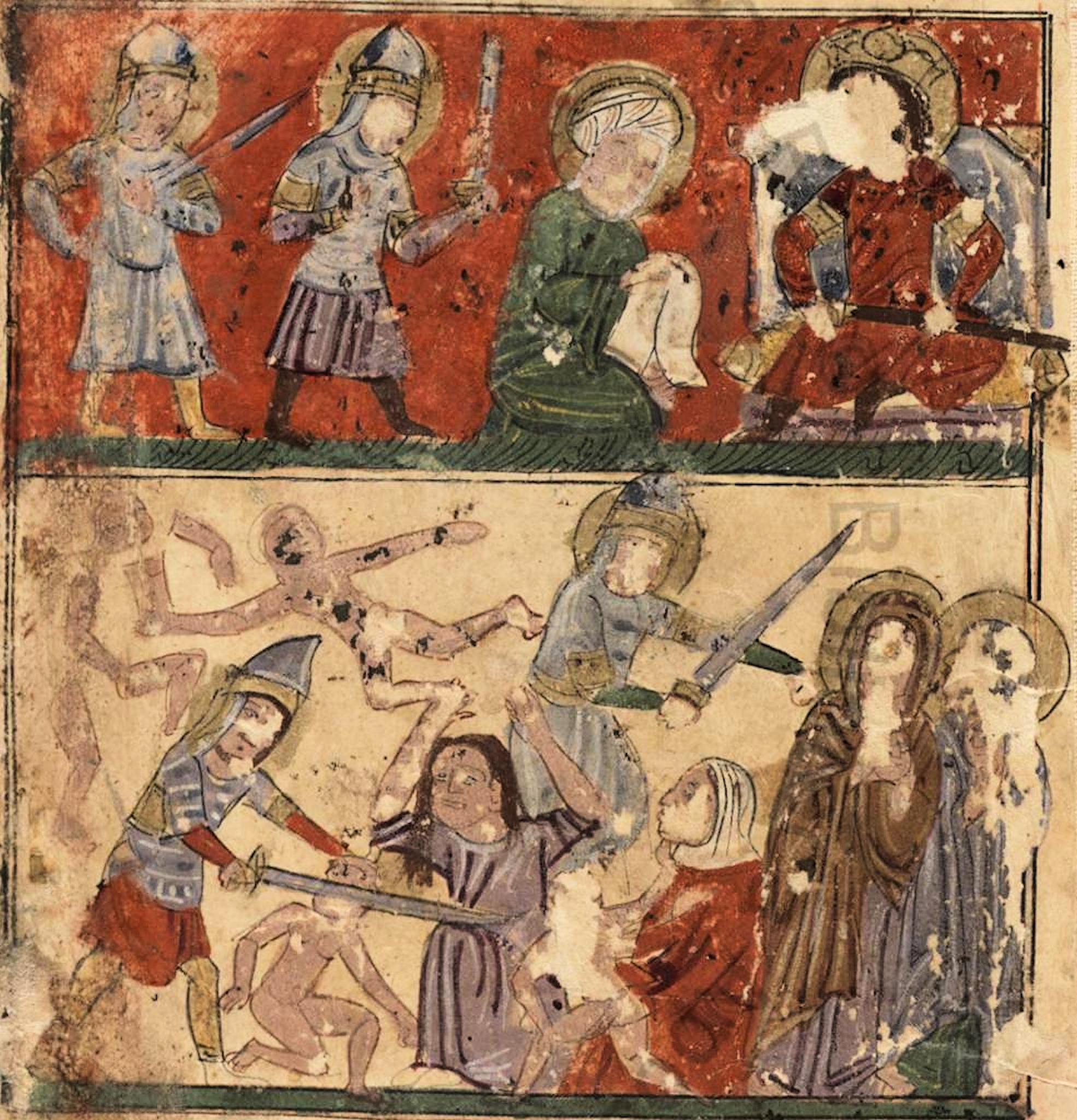
Massacre of the Innocents.

== Sources ==
- Snelders, B. (2010). Identity and Christian-Muslim interaction : medieval art of the Syrian Orthodox from the Mosul area. Peeters, Leuven.
- The Glory of Byzantium: Art and Culture of the Middle Byzantine Era, A.D. 843-1261. Metropolitan Museum of Art. 1997. pp. 384–385. ISBN 978-0-87099-777-8. (PdF)
