= Christopher of Antioch =

Chalcedonian patriarch

Saint Christopher of Antioch
- Patriarch of Antioch
- Church: Chalcedonian Church of Antioch
- See: Antioch
- Installed: 960
- Term ended: May 23, 967
- Predecessor: Agapios I
- Successor: Eustratius

Personal details
- Born: ʻĪsá Baghdad
- Died: May 23, 967 Antioch

Christopher (Arabic: خريسطوفورس, Kharīsṭūfūrus) was Chalcedonian Patriarch of Antioch from 960 to 967.

== Biography ==
A native of Baghdad who was originally named ʻĪsá, he moved to Syria under the rule of Sayf al-Dawla, the Hamdanid emir of Aleppo, and took a job as secretary to a subordinate emir in Shaizar. He intervened in Church controversies in Antioch and its Christian residents selected him as the new patriarch upon the death of Agapius I.

As patriarch, Christopher undertook educational and charitable efforts to help his Christian subjects, including negotiations with Sayf al-Dawla for tax reduction. When a rebellion broke out in Antioch in 965, led by Rashiq al-Nasimi, Christopher took the side of the emir and withdrew to the monastery of Simeon Stylites in order to avoid interaction with the rebels. After the rebellion was finally suppressed, this made the patriarch a favorite at the court of Sayf al-Dawla, but created enemies within Antioch.

When Sayf al-Dawla died in early 967, Christopher's enemies took advantage of the momentary power vacuum and plotted against him. Although he was warned of this danger by a Muslim friend named Ibn Abī ʻAmr, Christopher chose to remain in Antioch. Accusing the patriarch of conspiring against Antioch with Sayf al-Dawla's allies and with the Byzantines, the plotters convinced a group of visiting soldiers from Khorasan to kill him on the night of May 23, 967. His head was cut off and his body was thrown into the Orontes River. Shortly thereafter, a group of local Christians found the body in the river and took it in secret to a local monastery, where Christopher began to be venerated as a martyr.

In late 969, the armies of Emperor Nikephoros II conquered Antioch, and the new patriarch of Antioch (Theodorus II) brought Christopher's body into the city for public veneration. He was finally interred in a marble sarcophagus on the western side of the church of St. Peter.

== Legacy ==
For centuries, Christopher was venerated as a saint by the Greek Orthodox Church of Antioch on either May 21 or May 22, as shown by liturgical manuscripts in both Syriac and Arabic that include calendars of saints. However, with the growing dominance of the Byzantine Rite in early modern Syria, his veneration fell into disuse.

== Sources ==
By far the most detailed source for Christopher's life is the Life of Christopher by Ibrahim ibn Yuhanna, a Byzantine bureaucrat who knew Christopher as a child in Antioch. This text was originally written in both Greek and Arabic, but only the Arabic version survives. It was edited and translated into French by Habib Zayat in 1952. Significant portions of his story are also included in the history of Yahya of Antioch, and brief notices—centered on Christopher's death—appear in the Byzantine histories of Leo the Deacon and John Skylitzes.
