= Kadirli =

- Municipality
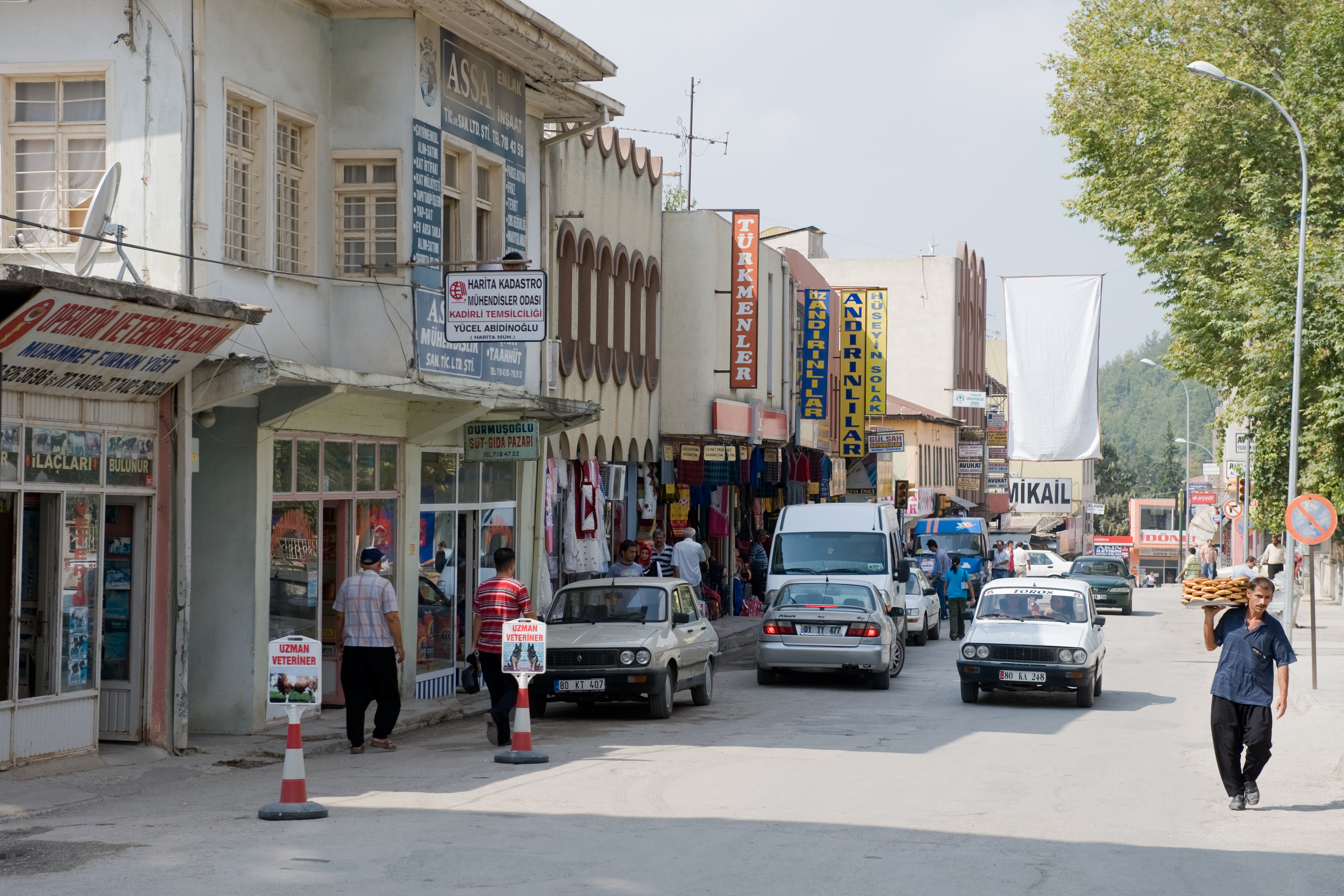
- A street in Kadirli

- Location within Turkey
- Coordinates: 37°22′11″N 36°06′00″E
- Country: Turkey
- Province: Osmaniye
- District: Kadirli

Government
  - Mayor: Mustafa Mert Olcar (CHP)
- Population (2022): 98,469
- Time zone: UTC+3 (TRT)
- Postal code: 80750
- Area code: 0328
- Website: www.kadirli.bel.tr

Kadirli, historically Kars (Armenian: Գարս) or Karsbazar (Armenian: Գարս Փազար), is a city in Osmaniye Province in the Mediterranean region of Turkey. It is the seat of Kadirli District. Its population is 98,469 (2022). It is located in the Çukurova plain, 41 kilometres (25 miles) from the province's capital, Osmaniye. It is located near the ancient site of Flaviopolis.

== History ==
The Cilicia/Çukurova plain is rich farmland and a place of strategic importance on an important trade route between the Middle East and Anatolia. It has been settled since the time of the Hittites and after by various civilizations: Assyrians, Romans (the Roman city of Flavius may have been located here), Byzantines, Armenians and finally Turks. The most prominent group of Turks to settle here were the Dulkadir lords, semi-autonomous barons during the Ottoman era, who ruled Gaziantep, Kahramanmaraş and Hatay for two centuries. They were dispersed after the land was captured by the Ottoman sultan Yavuz Sultan Selim I in 1517.

Kadirli was occupied by French forces at the end of the First World War under the terms of the armistice signed by the Ottoman Empire. The French forces were resisted by local peoples and eventually withdrew from the town in March 1920. Kadirli was a district (ilçe) in Kozan province between 1923-1926 and in Adana Province between 1926 and 1995. In 1996, it was attached to the newly created province of Osmaniye.

== Kadirli today ==
Kadirli is a town providing the basic infrastructure, such as shops and schools, to an area of rich farmland, which produces grain and 75% of Turkey's radishes. There are two reservoirs for irrigating the area. There is small scale industry.

In the summertime, families move to the uplands of Taurus Mountains, mainly Plateau Maksutolugu, adjacent to Kahramanmaraş because of hot weather in a general manner, also working people staying in town join their families in the weekends. In recent times, inhabitants also prefer to spend their summertime at the sea side in Yumurtalık and Mersin during hot season as an alternative of moving to plateau.

In Kadirli, there is a vocational college connected with the Korkut Ata University, Osmaniye. The college offers two educational programs: Computer Programming and Industrial Electronics since 1997.

== Demographics ==
Evliya Çelebi wrote that the town was mostly inhabited by Turcomans in his seyahatname. On the eve of World War I, before the Armenian genocide, the town had a population of 2,000 of which 1,800 were Armenians. In addition to a small church, the town maintained an Armenian school, attended by 85 students in 1900.

== Places of interest ==
There are many archaeological and touristic sites nearby such as:

- Karatepe National Park - 23 kilometres (14 miles) from Kadirli. The ruins of a walled city of the time of the Hittites. Discovered by archaeologists Halet Cambel and Helmuth Theodor Bossert. Relics found here date from a late Hittite kingdom (8th century BC) and include vast historic tablets, statues and ruins, even a monumental gate and pillars of lions and sphinxes. The ruins even gave us inscriptions in Hittite and Phoenician, which have been used to decipher the Hittite language.
- The Ala Cami is the oldest surviving monument in Kadirli. Its remains display over a millennium and a half of local history in several building phases. In the late 5th / early 6th century the site was artificially terraced for the construction of a large basilical church, built in at least two stages from a variety of reused architectural elements and incorporating the hypogeum as a crypt. It later seems to have fallen into disuse until the medieval period when it was converted into an Armenian church. This involved some modification to the original structure and the addition of a small church that sits inside the former nave of the church and reuses the original apse. This small church was converted into a mosque in the late 15th century, and a minaret was attached to the original Byzantine structure.

== See also ==
- Çukurova
- Osmaniye
