= John of Antioch =

John of Antioch may refer to:

== People from Antioch ==
- John Chrysostom (c. 347–407), born in Antioch, archbishop of Constantinople
- John Scholasticus (died 577), born in Antioch, patriarch of Constantinople from 565 to 577
- John Malalas (died 578), chronicler
- John of Antioch (historian), a 7th-century monk and chronicler
- John of Antioch, marshal of Cyprus in 1247
- John of Antioch (translator), fl. 1282
- Jean II de Giblet (died 1315), Cypriot nobleman

== Bishops and patriarchs of Antioch ==
- John I of Antioch, patriarch of Antioch from 429 to 441
- John Maron (died 707), Maronite patriarch of Antioch
- John III of the Sedre, Syrian Orthodox patriarch of Antioch from 631 to 648
- John IV of Antioch, Syrian Orthodox patriarch of Antioch from 846 to 873
- John III of Antioch, Greek Orthodox patriarch of Antioch from 996 to 1021
- John VIII bar Abdoun, Syrian Orthodox patriarch of Antioch from 1004 to 1033
- John X bar Shushan, Syriac Orthodox patriarch of Antioch from 1063 to 1073
- John the Oxite, Greek Orthodox patriarch from 1089 to 1100
- John XI bar Mawdyono, Syriac Orthodox patriarch of Antioch from 1130 to 1137
- John XII of Antioch, Syriac Orthodox patriarch of Antioch from 1208 to 1220
- John XIII bar Ma'dani, Syriac Orthodox patriarch of Antioch from 1252 to 1263
- Ignatius John XIV, Syriac Orthodox patriarch of Antioch from 1483 to 1493
- John X of Antioch, Greek Orthodox patriarch since 2012

== Princes of Antioch ==
- John of Lusignan (died 1375), regent of Cyprus
- John of Coimbra, Prince of Antioch (died 1457), husband of Charlotte of Cyprus
- John II of Cyprus (died 1458), king of Cyprus, Armenia and Jerusalem
