= Agapios I of Antioch =

Tenth-century Patriarch of Antioch

Patriarch Agapios I
- Bishop of Antioch
- Church: Melkite Greek Orthodox Church
- Installed: 952/3
- Term ended: 959/60
- Successor: Christopher of Antioch

Personal details
- Residence: Antioch

Agapios I (Ancient Greek: Ἀγάπιος; Arabic: أغابيوس بن القبرون, Aġābiyūs b. al-Qa‘barūn), also known simply as Agapios, was the Melkite Patriarch of Antioch from approximately 953 to 959.

== Biography ==
Agapius assumed the patriarchal throne in the year 341 AH, which corresponds to the period between 29 May 952 and 17 May 953, during the seventh year of the caliphate of the Abbasid caliph Al-Muti. According to the Arabic chronicle of Yahya of Antioch, he served for seven years and died in 348 AH (between 14 March 959 and 2 March 960). The Vita Christophori patriarchae confirms that he was the immediate predecessor of Patriarch Christopher. In 956, Agapius was the addressee of an inaugural letter from Patriarch Polyeuctos of Constantinople. The letter was delivered by Theodoros of Nicaea shortly after Polyeuctos's accession on 3 April of that year.

== Notes ==
Agapius is omitted from the patriarchal lists compiled by Venance Grumel and Giorgio Fedalto. In these lists, as well as in the work of Jenkins and Mango, a later patriarch named Agapios (who reigned from 978 to 996) is erroneously designated as "Agapios I."
