= Kadirli District =

District of Osmaniye Province, Turkey

- District
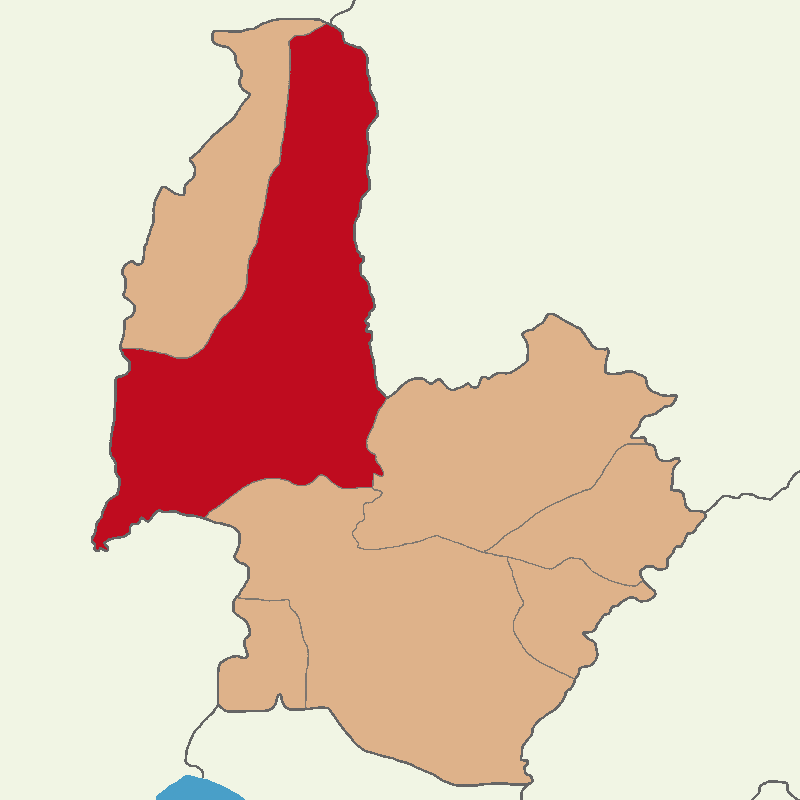
- Map showing Kadirli District in Osmaniye Province

- Location in Turkey
- Coordinates: 37°22′N 36°06′E
- Country: Turkey
- Province: Osmaniye
- Seat: Kadirli

Government
  - Kaymakam: Vehbi Bakır
- Area: 1,021 km^{2} (394 sq mi)
- Population (2022): 127,004
  - Density: 120/km^{2} (320/sq mi)
- Time zone: UTC+3 (TRT)
- Website: www.kadirli.gov.tr

Kadirli District is a district of the Osmaniye Province of Turkey. Its seat is the city of Kadirli. Its area is 1,021 km^{2}, and its population is 127,004 (2022).

== Composition ==
There is one municipality in Kadirli District:

- Kadirli

There are 60 villages in Kadirli District:

- Akköprü
- Akova
- Anberinarkı
- Aşağıbozkuyu
- Aşağıçayanlı
- Aydınlar
- Azaplı
- Bahadırlı
- Bekereci
- Çaygeçit
- Çınar
- Çiğcik
- Çiğdemli
- Coşkunlar
- Çukurköprü
- Değirmendere
- Durmuşsofular
- Elbistanlı
- Erdoğdu
- Göztaşı
- Hacıhaliloğlu
- Halitağalar
- Hardallık
- Harkaştığı
- Kabayar
- Karabacak
- Karakütük
- Karatepe
- Kayasuyu
- Kerimli
- Kesikkeli
- Kesim
- Kiremitli
- Kızyusuflu
- Koçlu
- Kösepınarı
- Kümbet
- Mecidiye
- Mehedinli
- Mezretli
- Narlıkışla
- Öksüzlü
- Oruçbey
- Şahaplı
- Sarıtanışmanlı
- Sofular
- Söğütlüdere
- Tahta
- Tatarlı
- Tekeli
- Topraktepe
- Tozlu
- Vayvaylı
- Yalnızdut
- Yenigün
- Yeniköy
- Yoğunoluk
- Yukarıbozkuyu
- Yukarıçayanlı
- Yusufizzettin
