= John III of Antioch (Chalcedonian) =

Patriarch of Antioch, 996 to 1021

Patriarch John III
- Bishop of Antioch
- Church: Greek Orthodox Church
- Installed: 4 October 996
- Term ended: July 1021
- Predecessor: Agapios II
- Successor: Nicholas II

Personal details
- Born: Constantinople
- Died: 1021
- Residence: Constantinople, Antioch

John of Antioch (Ancient Greek: Ἰωάννης; Arabic: يوحنا, Yūḥannā), also known by the epithet Polites (Greek: ὁ πολίτης, literally "the Citizen"), was the Chalcedonian Patriarch of Antioch from 4 October 996 until his death in July 1021. Before his elevation to the patriarchate, he served as the chartophylax of the Hagia Sophia in Constantinople.

== Early life and career ==
John's epithet "Polites" suggests he was a native of Constantinople. He held the titles of deacon, koubikouleisios, basilikos klerikos, and chartophylax, as attested by his surviving seals. As chartophylax of the Hagia Sophia, he was the recipient of several letters from Leo of Synada, indicating a close friendship between the two men. In one instance, the two arranged to meet at Dorylaion but missed each other because John arrived too early. A nephew of John named Demetrios is also mentioned in these letters.

== Patriarchate ==
Following the forced abdication of Agapios II by Emperor Basil II, John was appointed as the new Patriarch of Antioch and consecrated in Constantinople on 4 October 996. At the beginning of his patriarchate, he received imperial instructions to rebuild the Cathedral of Hagios Petros (the Kassianos Church) in Antioch after the model of the Hagia Sophia.

During his tenure, John corresponded with various church figures. He is the author of canonical responses concerning baptism (Responsa de baptismo) addressed to Theodoros, the Metropolitan of Ephesus, which some scholars suggest he may have written while still chartophylax in Constantinople. He also received letters from Philetos of Synada, who interceded with John on behalf of an exiled man named Thomas and urged John to petition the dux of Antioch, Nikephoros Ouranos, for a pardon following the latter's military victory around 1005/1006.

John was also involved in inter-patriarchal relations. According to the Georgian author Ephrem Mtsire, John transferred the Patriarchate of Antioch's claim to the financial contributions of the Georgian Church for the consecration of myron to the Patriarchate of Jerusalem under Orestes, an event that likely occurred around 1000 when Orestes traveled through Antioch to Constantinople. Furthermore, the Syriac chronicler Michael the Syrian notes that the Chalcedonian Patriarch of Antioch held the Jacobite Patriarch Athanasios in high regard, a reference generally attributed to John.

== Works ==
Epistula Ioannis Antiocheni episcopi ad Theodorum episcopum Ephesinum (excerpt), edited by L. Allatius in De aetate et interstitiis in collatione ordinum etiam apud Graecos servandis (Rome, 1638).

== Death and legacy ==
John died after a patriarchate lasting twenty-four years and nine months, placing his death in July 1021.
