= John XII of Antioch =

81st Patriarch of Syriac Orthodox Church of Antioch

John XII
- Syriac Orthodox Patriarch of Antioch and All the East
- Church: Syriac Orthodox Church
- See: Antioch
- Installed: 1208
- Term ended: 1220
- Predecessor: Athanasius VIII
- Successor: Ignatius III David

Personal details
- Born: Yeshu
- Died: 1220

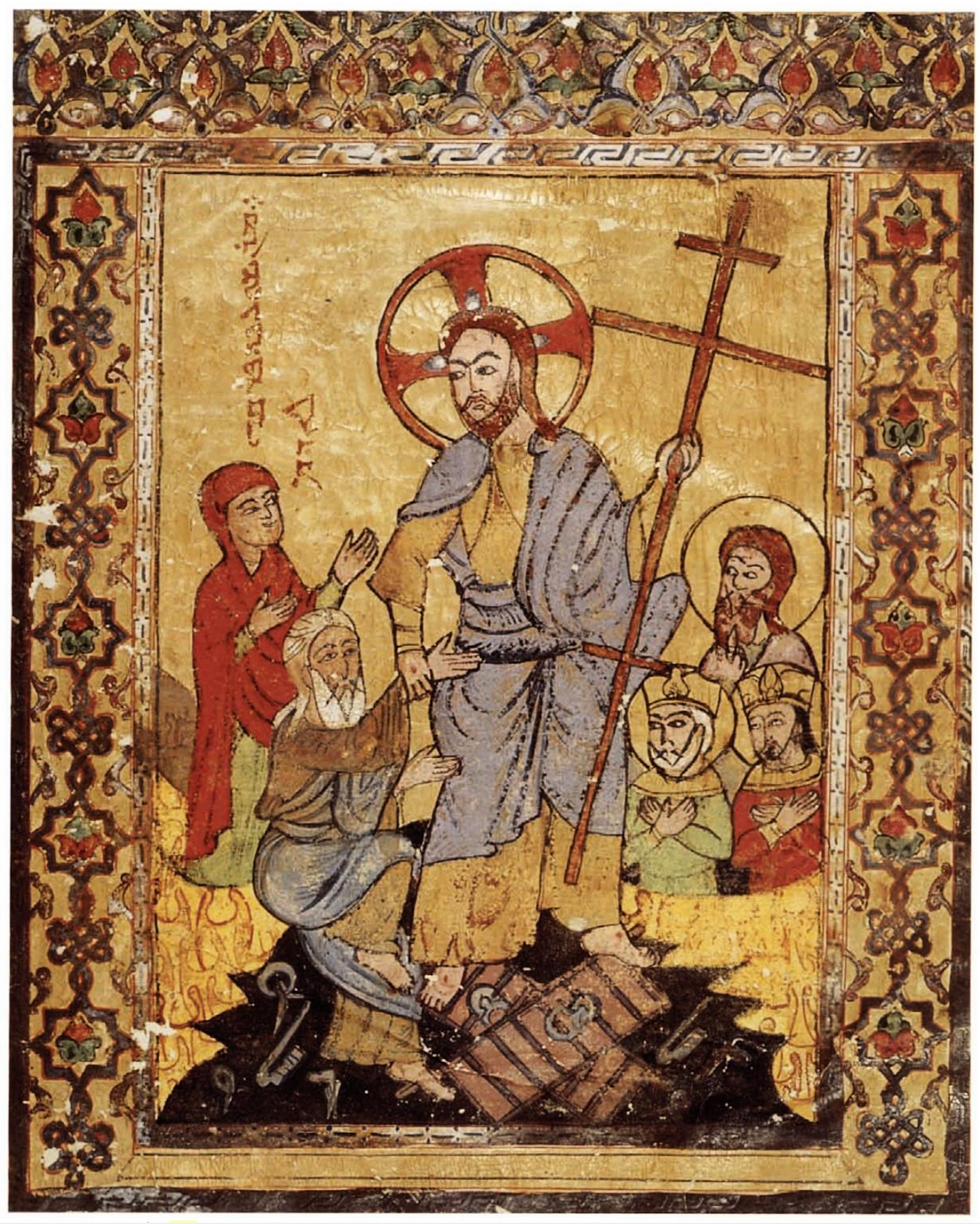
Syriac Gospels, British Library, Add. 7170 was started at the time of John XII of Antioch. Christ resurrected.

John XII Yeshu was the Patriarch of Antioch, and head of the Syriac Orthodox Church from 1208 until his death in 1220.

== Biography ==
Yeshu, son of a priest called John, was born in the 12th century. He became a monk at the Monastery of the Akhsnoye (Stranger Ascetics) on the Sacred Mountain of Edessa where he became known for his asceticism. Yeshu was elevated to priesthood before 1191 and later moved to the Shiro Monastery to study Syriac and calligraphy.

During his time at the monastery he transcribed many manuscripts in Estrangelo of which his manuscripts of the Gospels can be found in Paris and the Edessene Library in Aleppo. Yeshu also wrote poems and liturgy leading him to gain the title of Yeshu the Scribe and he was also known as the Short One in relation to his height.

Yeshu was ordained patriarch on 31 August 1208 and upon which he took the name John and was frequently referred to as John the Stranger Scribe (Syriac:Yuhanon Akhsnoyo Kothubo), referring to his stay at the Monastery of the Stranger Ascetics. John appointed Ignatius David as Maphrian of the East in 1215. John administered the Syriac Orthodox Church for 12 years until his death in 1220.

== Sources ==
- Snelders, B. (2010). Identity and Christian-Muslim interaction : medieval art of the Syrian Orthodox from the Mosul area. Peeters, Leuven.
- The Scattered Pearls: A History of Syriac Literature and Sciences - Ignatius Aphrem I Barsoum. Archived from the original on 2014-07-14.
- "Catholicate of the East". Archived from the original on 2011-07-21.

Preceded by Athanasius VIII	Syriac Orthodox Patriarch of Antioch; 1208–1220	Succeeded by Ignatius III David
