= Flaviopolis (Cilicia) =

Ancient Roman city in Cilicia

Coordinates: 37°21′59″N 36°06′06″E

Flaviopolis (Ancient Greek: Φλαβιόπολις or Φλαοϋιόπολις), or Phlaouiopolis, or Flavias, was a town of ancient Cilicia. Respecting its history scarcely anything is known, and it cannot be ascertained whether it owed its name to the emperor Vespasian, or to some member of the family of Constantine. In later times it was the see of a Christian bishop.

Its site is located near Kadirli in Asiatic Turkey.
