= Agapios II of Antioch =

Tenth-century Patriarch of Antioch

Agapios II
- Patriarch of Antioch
- Church: Greek Orthodox Church
- Installed: 20 January 978
- Term ended: September 996
- Predecessor: Theodore II
- Successor: John III

Personal details
- Died: 8 September 997 Constantinople
- Residence: Aleppo, Constantinople, Antioch

Agapios II (Ancient Greek: Ἀγάπιος; Arabic: أغابيوس, Aġābiyūs; died 8 September 997) was the Patriarch of Antioch from 20 January 978 until his abdication in September 996. Initially serving as the Bishop of Aleppo, he secured the patriarchal throne through a political agreement with Emperor Basil II, helping to bring the city of Antioch back under imperial control during the rebellion of Bardas Skleros. His tenure was marked by ecclesiastical disputes, the turmoil of Bardas Phokas's revolt, and a lengthy period of exile in Constantinople. In Syriac Orthodox sources, he is remembered for his aggressive and sometimes violent efforts to impose Chalcedonian Christianity in Antioch.

== Biography ==
=== Early life and elevation to the Patriarchate ===
Agapios served initially as the Bishop of Aleppo. According to the historian Yahya of Antioch, following the death of Patriarch Theodore II in May 976, Agapios traveled to Constantinople carrying a list of candidates for the Patriarchal throne of Antioch. This list had been compiled by the city's inhabitants and notably included Agapios's own name.

Agapios struck a deal with Emperor Basil II: in exchange for being elevated to the Patriarchate of Antioch, Agapios promised to bring the city—which was then under the control of the magistros 'Ubaydallah—back under imperial authority. This involved extracting the city from the rebellion of Bardas Skleros and ensuring that the emperor's name, rather than Skleros's, was commemorated in the liturgy. On his return journey, disguised as a monk, Agapios secretly delivered an imperial letter to 'Ubaydallah. Consequently, 'Ubaydallah defected from Bardas Skleros and installed Agapios as the new Patriarch of Antioch. Agapios was officially consecrated on 20 January 978. Some manuscripts of the text Peri Metatheseon erroneously claim that prior to his elevation, Agapios was the Archbishop of Seleucia Pieria. Furthermore, certain manuscripts of the same text propagate the entirely inaccurate information that Agapios became the Patriarch of Jerusalem.

=== Patriarchate and ecclesiastical disputes ===
Upon assuming the patriarchal throne, Agapios wrote a synodal letter to Elias, the Patriarch of Alexandria. Elias responded critically, challenging the translation of Agapios from the bishopric of Aleppo to the patriarchal see of Antioch as uncanonical. Yahya preserves a reply from Agapios that refuted Elias's arguments and reportedly satisfied the Patriarch of Alexandria.

The Syriac Orthodox chronicler Michael the Syrian provides a highly critical account of Agapios's tenure, reflecting the deep confessional tensions of the time. Michael reports that after establishing himself in Antioch, Agapios bribed the city's nobles to have their children baptized according to the Chalcedonian rite. Having won over the elite, Agapios allegedly used force to compel the rest of the population to convert to Chalcedonian Christianity, expelling those who refused. Michael further claims that Agapios devastated the main church and ordered the Gospels and other liturgical books to be burned, though he adds that the books miraculously survived the fire. According to Michael, Agapios continued to persecute the Syriac Orthodox ("Jacobites") and Armenians until his death.

=== Rebellion, exile, and abdication ===
During the rebellion of Bardas Phokas the Younger, Phokas's son Leon controlled Antioch. In approximately March 989, Leon removed Agapios from the city through a ruse to prevent the Patriarch from acting against the rebels.

Following the suppression of the revolt, Emperor Basil II suspected Agapios of having collaborated with Bardas Phokas. Consequently, towards the end of 989, Agapios was exiled and interned in a monastery in Constantinople, likely the Hodegon Monastery. Despite his exile, Agapios continued to perform ordinations for his patriarchate, and his instructions were carried out in Antioch, allowing him to function as Patriarch for nearly seven years while confined in the capital.

Under continued pressure from Basil II, Agapios formally abdicated in September 996. In exchange for his resignation, he was granted a monastery in Constantinople—possibly the Pikridion Monastery—with an annual income of 1,000 nomismata. Additionally, he was granted 240 nomismata annually from the revenues of the Church of Antioch, and the emperor guaranteed that his name would continue to be commemorated in the diptychs of the Antiochene church.

=== Death and commemoration ===
Agapios was succeeded as Patriarch of Antioch by John III. He died a year after his abdication, on 8 September 997, in his monastery in Constantinople.

He is commemorated in the diptychs of the Liturgy of Saint James, as preserved in the manuscript Messanensis gr. 177. This liturgical parchment scroll was written in Southern Italy shortly after 1006 in the so-called "Pique-As" style, based on an earlier exemplar produced around 979–983 in Palestine or Sinai. In the prayer contained within the manuscript, Agapios is correctly mentioned as deceased, reflecting the time of the scroll's copying.

== Notes ==
Some manuscripts of the Peri Metatheseon add a report that Agapios concelebrated the liturgy with Patriarch Nicholas II Chrysoberges and the holy synod after arriving in Constantinople. If accurate, this likely occurred after his return from the East and subsequent internment in late 989, though the reliability of this specific source is considered low.
