= John XIII bar Ma'dani =

83rd Patriarch of Syriac Orthodox Church of Antioch (1252 - 1263)

- Syriac Orthodox Patriarch of Antioch and All the East
- Church: Syriac Orthodox Church
- See: Antioch
- Installed: 1252
- Term ended: 1263
- Predecessor: Ignatius III David
- Successor: Ignatius IV Yeshu

Personal details
- Born: Aaron Ma’dan
- Died: 1263 Baqismat Monastery, Sis, Cilician Armenia

John XIII Aaron bar Ma'dani was the Patriarch of Antioch, and head of the Syriac Orthodox Church from 1252 until his death in 1263.

== Biography ==
Aaron was born in Ma'dan in the 13th century. In 1230, Aaron was ordained as metropolitan of Mardin, upon which he assumed the name John and two years later he was elevated to maphrian by Ignatius III David. As maphrian, John studied and became fluent in Arabic, with which he wrote sermons and letters.

After the death of Ignatius III David, John was elected as patriarch and was consecrated on 4 December 1252. John was patriarch for eleven years before his death in 1263 at the Baqismat Monastery in Sis, Cilician Armenia.

== Works ==
Whilst acting as maphrian, John is known to have composed fifty-two short stories, one of which was translated into Arabic. As well as this John wrote an ode to Aaron the Ascetic and a forty-seven page anthology, containing his most famous poem, The Bird.

John also wrote four homilies in Syriac on Palm Sunday, the Cross, the Presentation of our Lord in the Temple and New Sunday which he later translated into Arabic. In addition to this, John wrote a liturgy and seven canons, six of which he issued at the Monastery of Mor Hananyo and the seventh was included in his early patriarchal proclamations.

== See also ==
- Opizzo Fieschi, nephew of Innocent IV and Latin Patriarch of Antioch during John XII's tenure

| Preceded by Ignatius III David | Syrian Orthodox Patriarch of Antioch; 1252–1263 | Succeeded by Ignatius IV Yeshu |
