= George of Antioch (disambiguation) =

George of Antioch (died 1151/1152) was an Italian admiral in the Norman kingdom of Sicily.

George of Antioch may also refer to:

- George the Confessor (died 814), Bishop of Antioch in Pisidia
- George I of Antioch (Greek Orthodox) (r. 640-656), Greek Orthodox Patriarch of Antioch
- George of Beltan, Syriac Orthodox Patriarch of Antioch (r. 758-790)
- George II of Antioch, Greek Orthodox Patriarch of Antioch (r. 690–695)
- Ignatius George II, Syriac Orthodox Patriarch of Antioch (r. 1687–1708)
- Ignatius George III, Syriac Orthodox Patriarch of Antioch (r. 1745–1768)
- Ignatius George IV, Syriac Orthodox Patriarch of Antioch (r. 1768–1781)
- Ignatius George V, Syriac Orthodox Patriarch of Antioch (r. 1819–1837)
- Ignatius George V Shelhot, Syriac Catholic Patriarch of Antioch (r. 1874–1891)
