= Patriarch George =

Patriarch George may refer to:

- Patriarch George I of Alexandria, Greek Orthodox Patriarch of Alexandria (r. 621–631)
- Patriarch George I of Antioch, Greek Orthodox Patriarch of Antioch (r. 640-656)
- George I of Constantinople, Ecumenical Patriarch of Constantinople (r. 679–686)
- George of Beltan, Syriac Orthodox Patriarch of Antioch (r. 758–790)
- George of Jerusalem, Greek Orthodox Patriarch of Jerusalem (r. 797–807)
- George II of Antioch, Greek Orthodox Patriarch of Antioch (r. 690–695)
- Patriarch George II of Alexandria, Greek Orthodox Patriarch of Alexandria (r. 1021–1051)
- George II of Constantinople, Ecumenical Patriarch of Constantinople (r. 1191–1198)
- George Beseb'ely, Maronite Patriarch of Antioch (r. 1657–1670)
- Ignatius George II, Syriac Orthodox Patriarch of Antioch (r. 1687–1708)
- Ignatius George III, Syriac Orthodox Patriarch of Antioch (r. 1745–1768)
- Ignatius George IV, Syriac Orthodox Patriarch of Antioch (r. 1768–1781)
- Ignatius George V, Syriac Orthodox Patriarch of Antioch (r. 1819–1837)
- Ignatius George V Shelhot, Syriac Catholic Patriarch of Antioch (r. 1874–1891)
