= Syriac Orthodox Patriarch of Antioch and All the East =

Oriental Orthodox Christian episcopal office

Patriarch of Antioch and All the East ܦܛܪܝܪܟܐ ܕܐܢܛܝܘܟܝܐ

Syriac Orthodox Church
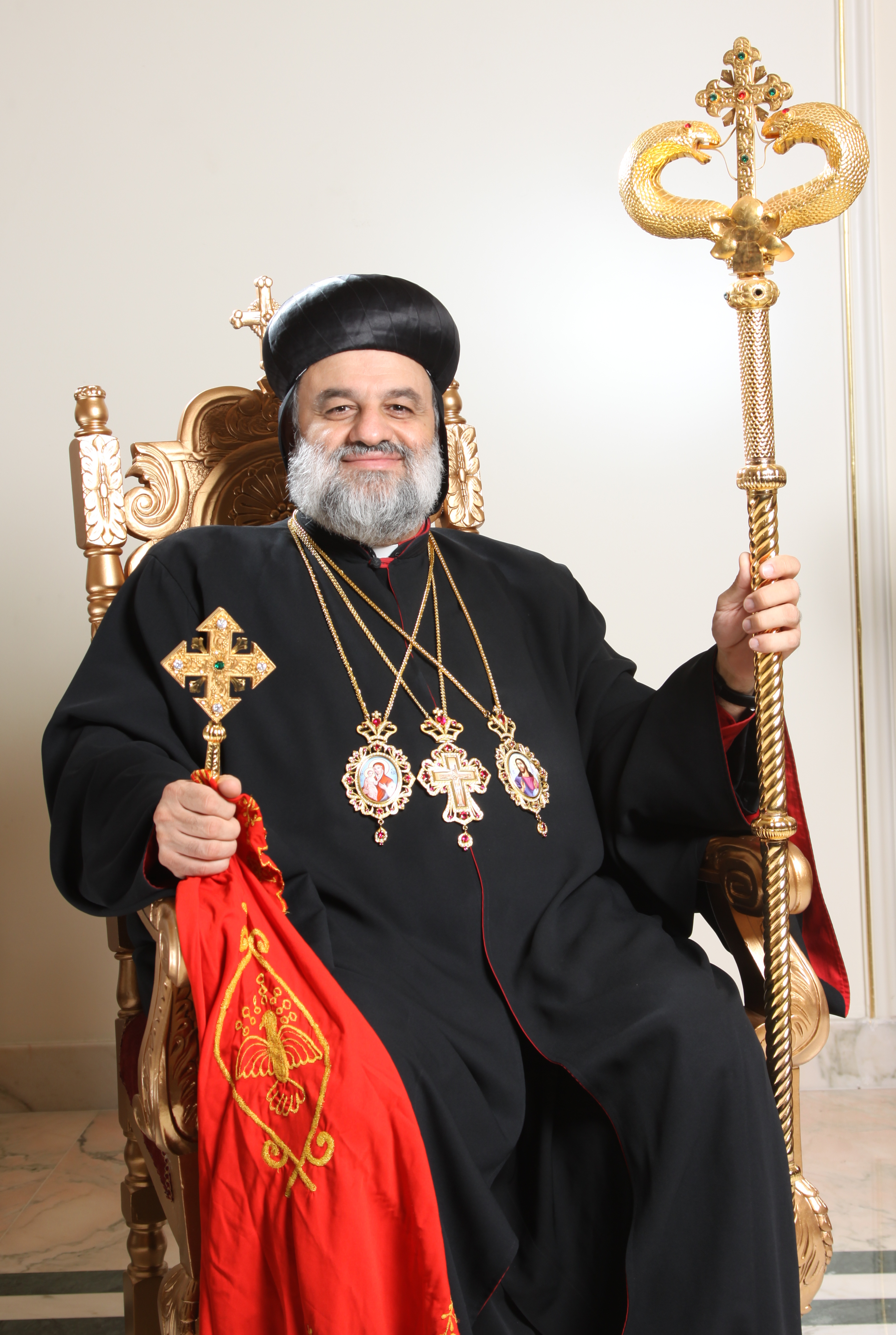

- Coat of arms
- Incumbent; Ignatius Aphrem II (since 2014)
- Style: Moran Mor; His Holiness the Patriarch

Location
- Country: Syria
- Territory: Holy See of Antioch and All the East; Syriac Orthodox Church
- Residence: Mor Aphrem Monastery, Ma`arat Sayyidnaya
- Headquarters: Bab Touma, Damascus, Syria

Information
- First holder: Saint Peter the Chief of Apostles
- Denomination: Oriental Orthodox Church
- Rite: Antiochian Rite
- Established: AD 32 at Antioch
- Cathedral: Patriarchal Cathedral of Saint George
- Language: Classical Syriac

The Syriac Orthodox Patriarch of Antioch and All the East (Syriac: ܦܛܪܝܪܟܐ ܕܐܢܛܝܘܟܝܐ ܘܕܟܠܗ̇ ܡܕܢܚܐ Paṭriarḵo ḏ-Anṭiuḵia waḏ-kuloh madnho) is the bishop of Antioch and head of the Syriac Orthodox Church. He presides over the Holy Synod of the Syriac Orthodox Church, which is the church's highest authority. The current patriarch is Ignatius Aphrem II, who was enthroned on 29 May 2014 as the 122nd Successor to Saint Peter.

The position of the patriarch of Antioch was established and first held by Peter the Apostle (Syriac: ܫܹܡܥܘܿܢ ܟܹ݁ܐܦ݂ܵܐ Šemʿōn Kēp̄ā). He officially oversees the Holy Apostolic See at Antioch (modern-day Antakya, in Turkey), though the patriarch currently resides in Damascus; the patriarch fled to Syria during the 1915 Assyrian genocide.

The Patriarchate of Antioch is one of three Petrine Sees of the Christian Church as affirmed by the Council of Nicaea, alongside the patriarch of Alexandria and the patriarch of Rome. He is considered primus inter pares (first among the equals) of the Diocese of the East.

== History of the Patriarchate ==
=== Origin ===
The Church of Antioch was established by Peter in AD 32. During the Synod of Nicaea, the Bishop of Antioch became one of the Patriarchates (along with fellow Patriarchate of Alexandria). After the Council at Chalcedon, Christianity split into the Catholic-Orthodox and the Oriental Orthodox, thus splitting the church. The Patriarch of Antioch (Severus) and Pope of Alexandria (Dioscorus) led the Oriental Orthodox Churches, which followed a miaphysite view of Christology and the Pope of Rome led the Catholic Church along with the Patriarch of Constantinople, which followed a dyophysite view on Christology.

Severus, the Patriarch of Antioch, was exiled to Egypt in 518 by the Emperor of the Byzantine Empire for following the Oriental Orthodox Churches. The Catholic group of the Church of Antioch (later Greek Orthodox Church of Antioch), accepted the new Patriarch Paul, appointed by the Pope of Rome, as their new Patriarch, after the exile of Severus. The Syriac Orthodox Church, or the Oriental Orthodox faction of the Church of Antioch, continued to accept Severus as Patriarch until his death in AD 538.

=== Revival ===
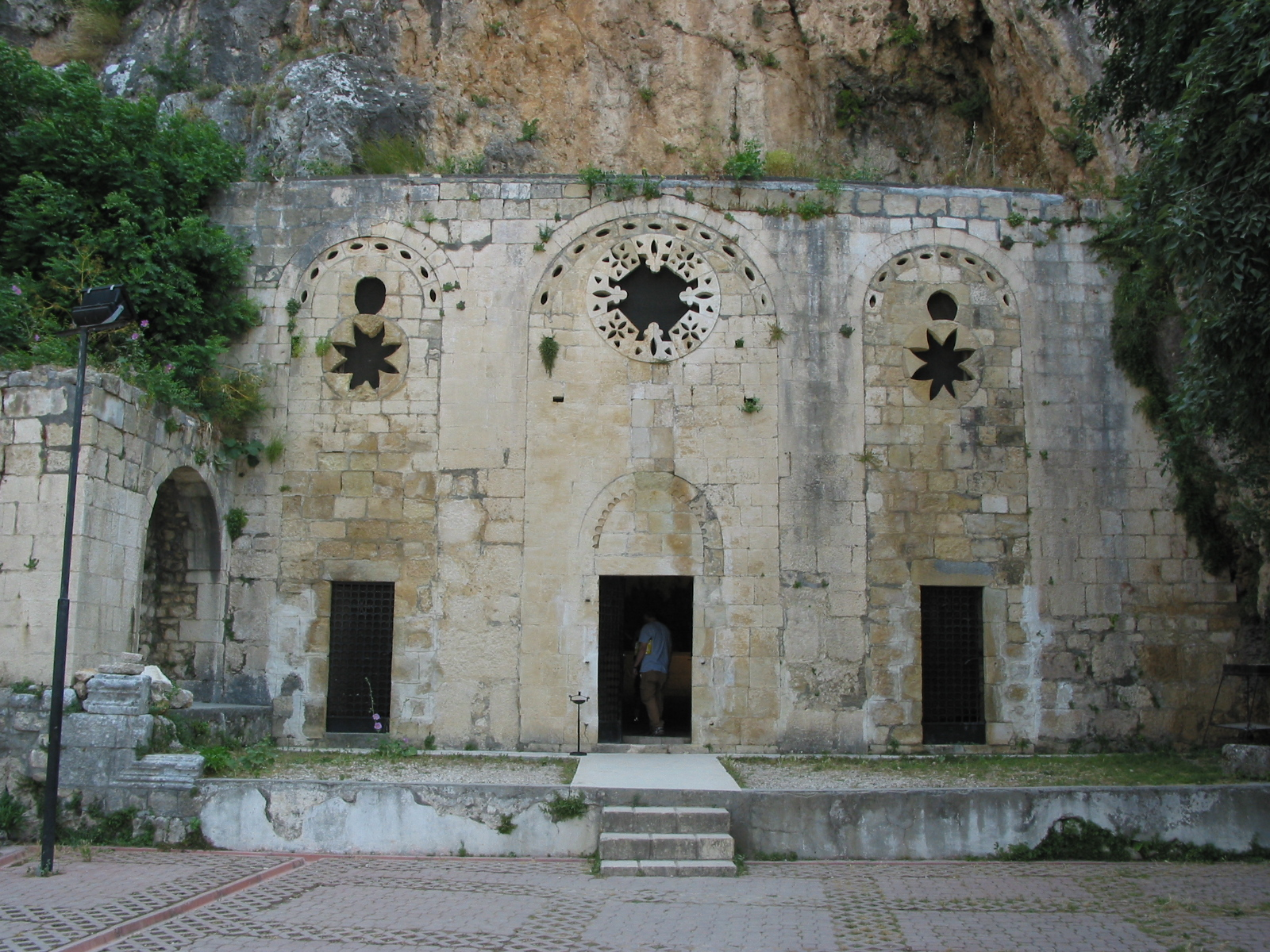
Church of St. Peter in Antioch, believed to be established by St. Peter the Apostle

By AD 544, the Syriac Orthodox Church had only three bishops remaining and no Syriac successor to Severus had been elected. During this time, a priest named Jacob traveled to Constantinople to ask Empress Theodora's (who was a Miaphysite herself), the daughter of a Syriac Orthodox priest, consent to be ordained as a bishop. He was ordained as Mor Jacob Baradeus (Mor Ya'qub Burdono ܝܥܩܘܒ ܒܘܪܕܥܝܐ), by Pope Theodosius I, Pope of Alexandria and he traveled to many places to revive the Syriac Orthodox Church. He managed to consecrate 27 bishops, and hundreds of priests and deacons for the church. He led the consecration of Mor Sergius of Tella as the Patriarch of Antioch (first Patriarch of the independent Syriac Orthodox Church) in 544. It is after this bishop that the Syriac Orthodox Church in India gets the name "Jacobite" (Jacobite Syrian Christian Church) He revived the Miaphysite belief in the Church of Antioch throughout persecution.

The Mor Bar Sauma Monastery became the seat of the patriarch between the 11th and 13th century until it was destroyed by an earthquake in 1285. The patriarchate was then moved to Sis before it finally settled in Dayro d-Mor Hananyo (Kurkmo Dayro, or Deir az-Za'faran), in Mardin, Turkey where it remained until 1933.

=== Split of the Syriac Catholic Church ===
In 1662, the vacant patriarchate was filled by individuals who aligned themselves with the Catholic Church. Andrew Akijan was elected in that year, and was succeeded by another Catholic in Gregory Peter VI Shahbaddin. The non-Catholic Syriac party elected the rival Abdulmasih I, Shahbaddin's uncle, as a competing patriarch. Upon Shahbaddin's death in 1702, the Catholic line died out for several decades until the Holy Synod in 1782 elected Michael III Jarweh, who again aligned the Syriacs with the pope. Following a period of violence and intrigue, the non-Catholic party was again recognized with their own patriarch and the Catholic line continued independently as the Syriac Catholic Church.

=== Persecution and Modern period ===
The Syriac Orthodox Church continued to be persecuted under the Arabs, Mongols, Crusaders, Mamluks, and Ottomans. During 1915 Assyrian Genocide(known as the Sayfo/ܣܝܦ or "the year of the sword" in Syriac), more than 250,000 Syriac Orthodox Christians in the Middle East were wiped out by the Ottoman Empire. Many Syriac Orthodox Villages were emptied, and historical monasteries and churches were destroyed. During the Assyrian genocide and concomitant World War I, the Patriarchate was forced to flee by the Ottoman Empire, and the patriarch fled to Homs, Syria in 1953, and later to Damascus, in 1957.

The Syriac Orthodox Church continues to grow to this day under the Patriarchate. The Syriac Orthodox Church, along with the rest of the Oriental Orthodox Churches, is now in sacramental cooperation with the Catholic Church, and is in dialogues with the Eastern Orthodox Church and the Catholic Church.

== Authority of the Patriarch ==
The Patriarch is considered the legitimate successor of Peter the Apostle, on the Holy Throne of Antioch.

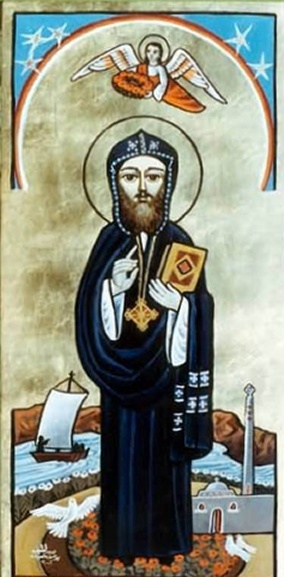
Saint Severus of Antioch, the 37th Patriarch of Antioch

The Patriarch, as first among the bishops, convenes the Holy Synod of the Syriac Orthodox Church and presides over the meeting.

The Patriarch, has the authority to enthrone the Maphrian (also known as the Catholicos of India) and consecrate bishops who are elected by the Holy Synod, but he has to be assisted by two other bishops (by his invitation). He is the only one authorized to conduct the consecration of a bishop or the Holy Chrism, but he may delegate these roles to another bishop. The Patriarch normally delegates the consecration of the bishops within the Catholicos See to the Catholicos(historically the consecration of the Holy Chrism as well).

The Patriarch signs all documents with other denominations and he alone is in charge of external relations with other churches. The Patriarch dispatches clergy on ecclesiastical and cultural works.

When the Patriarch visits a diocese, he sits on the Cathedral seat of the church. The bishops are not allowed to carry their pastoral staff and wear their red vestment in front of the Patriarch (bishops usually wear a red vestment while travelling in their diocese) in respect to the Apostolic See.

The Patriarch has the right to change, introduce, or abolish church rites. All Syriac Orthodox monasteries are in the hands of the Patriarch and he alone has the authority to appoint its caretakers.

== Requirements and Restrictions for the Patriarch ==
Requirements:

- The patriarch must be a member of the Syriac Orthodox Church.
- The patriarch must be over 40 years old.
- The patriarch can't be married.
- Previously, the patriarch was chosen from among the monks, and was then consecrated as a bishop, and then elevated to the Holy See of Antioch. In modern times, the patriarch is chosen from the bishops and is elevated to the Holy See.
- The patriarch must be elected by the Holy Synod, led by the Maphrian and the Patriarchal Locum Tenens, by all the bishops who are able to vote. If a bishop is not able to be present, he can send a vote through a letter. If he does not do this, his vote is canceled.
- Patriarch-elect has to be of Middle-Eastern origin, because he is the bishop of Antioch.
- The patriarch must keep the Syriac Orthodox faith strong and work to preserve it.
- The patriarch must be elevated by the Holy Synod, led by Maphrian (Catholicos of India), or if not present, the Patriarchal Locum Tenens, along with all the bishops of the Syriac Orthodox Church that are able to be present.

Restrictions:

- The patriarch must give all his assets to the Syriac Orthodox Church.
- The Holy See must not be vacant for more than 30 days unless there is an emergency.
- During a Holy Synod meeting, the patriarch must inform the Holy Synod about everything he has accomplished since their last meeting.

== Titles of the Patriarch ==
The following are a list of titles of the Patriarch of Antioch

The official title of the Patriarch of Antioch is:

His Holiness/Thrice Blessed Moran Mor Ignatius (Monastic Name) (Roman Numeral to distinguish from other Patriarchs of the same name) Patriarch of Antioch and All the East, and Supreme Head of the Universal Syriac Orthodox Church.

ܩܕܝܫܘܬܗ/ ܬܠܝܬܝ̈ ܛܘܒܐ̈ ܕܡܪܢ ܡܪܝ ܐܝܓܢܛܝܘܣ ... ܦܛܪܝܪܟܐ ܕܐܢܛܝܘܟܝܐ ܘܕܟܠܗ̇ ܡܕܢܚܐ ܘܪܝܫܐ ܓܘܢܝܐ ܕܥܕܬܐ ܣܘܪܝܝܬܐ ܬܪܝܨܬ ܫܘܒܚܐ ܒܟܠܗ̇ ܬܐܒܠ

Qaddišuṯeh/Tlithoy Tube ḏ-Moran Mor Iḡnaṭius ... Paṭriarḵo ḏ-Anṭiuḵia waḏ-Kuloh Maḏĕnḥo w-Rišo Gawonoyo ḏ-ʿItto Suryoyto Triṣaṯ Šuḇḥo ḇ-Kuloh Tiḇel

Other titles for the patriarch include:

- His Holiness (Syriac: ܩܕܝܫܘܬܗ Qaddišuṯeh)
- Thriced Blessed "Thrice Blessed" (Syriac: ܬܠܝܬܝ̈ ܛܘܒܐ̈ Tlithoy Ṭuḇe) (Not commonly used for modern Patriarchs)
- Mor Ignatius (ܐܝܓܢܐܛܝܘ)
- Prince Patriarch of Antioch and All the East
- Moran (Syriac: ܡܪܢ) (Literally translates to My Lord) (title is usually reserved for Jesus Christ, but sometimes (not traditionally) used for the Patriarch)
- Mor (Syriac: ܡܪܝ)(Literally translates to Lord)(used in the title of all Syriac Orthodox Bishops)
- Aboon(ܐܒܘܢ) (Translates to Our Father) (used by most clergy in the Syriac Orthodox Church) (used in the title of the Maphrian as Aboon Mor ܐܒܘܢ ܡܪܝ, or Our Father, Lord)
- Moran Mor (Syriac: ܡܪܢ ܡܪܝ) (Literally translates to My Lord, Lord)
- First Among the Equals
- Supreme Head of the Syriac Orthodox Church (Syriac: ܪܝܫܐ ܓܘܢܝܐ ܕܥܺܕܬܳܐ ܣܽܘ̣ܪܝܳܝܬܳܐ ܬܪܺܝܨܰܬ ܫܽܘ̣ܒ̣ܚܳܐ Rišo Gawonoyo ḏ-Idto Suryoyto Triṣaṯ Šuḇḥo)
- Supreme Head of the Universal Syriac Orthodox Church (Syriac: ܪܝܫܐ ܓܘܢܝܐ ܕܥܕܬܐ ܣܘܪܝܝܬܐ ܬܪܝܨܬ ܫܘܒܚܐ ܒܟܠܗ̇ ܬܐܒܠ Rišo Gawonoyo ḏ-ʿItto Suryoyto Triṣaṯ Šuḇḥo ḇ-Kuloh Tiḇel)
- Successor of Saint Peter
- Pontiff (from Latin pontifex) (used by all Patriarchs in the Pentarchy)
- Patriarch of Antioch (Syriac: ܦܛܪܝܪܟܐ ܕܐܢܛܝܘܟܝܐ Paṭriarḵo ḏ-Anṭiuḵia)
- Bishop of Antioch
- Bishop of the Patriarchal diocese of Antioch and All the East
- Prince Patriarch of Universal Syriac Orthodox Churches
- Patriarch of Antioch and All the East (Syriac: ܦܛܪܝܪܟܐ ܕܐܢܛܝܘܟܝܐ ܘܕܟܠܗ̇ ܡܕܢܚܐ Paṭriarḵo ḏ-Anṭiuḵia waḏ-kuloh madnho)
- Patriarch of the Syriac Orthodox Church (Syriac: ܦܛܪܝܪܟܐ ܕܥܺܕܬܳܐ ܣܽܘ̣ܪܝܳܝܬܳܐ ܬܪܺܝܨܰܬ ܫܽܘ̣ܒ̣ܚܳܐ Paṭriarḵo ḏ-Idto Suryoyto Triṣaṯ Šuḇḥo)

== Bibliography ==
- Kaufhold, Hubert (2000). "Notizen zur Späten Geschichte des Barsaumo-Klosters". Hugoye: Journal of Syriac Studies. 3 (2).
- Gregorios, Paulos (1999). Introducing the Orthodox Churches. Delhi: Mar Gregorios Foundation of Orthodox Theological Seminary, Kottayam and Indian Society for Promoting Christian Knowledge. ISBN 978-81-7214-487-6. OCLC 42764031.
