= Syriac Orthodox Archdiocese of Aleppo =

Archdiocese of Aleppo

Syriac Orthodox Church
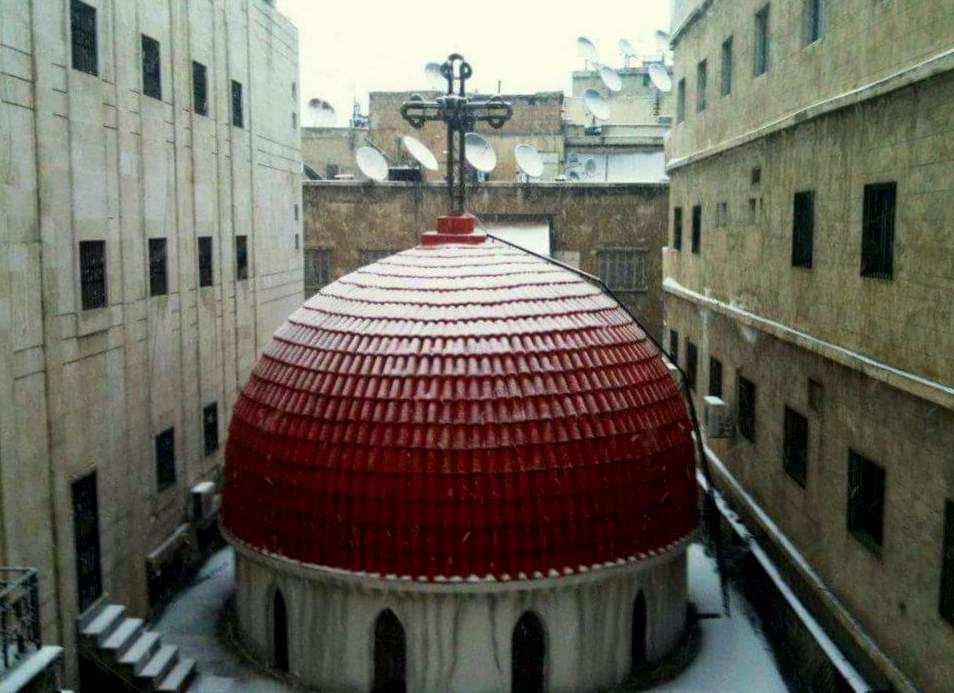
- Incumbent; Mor Boutros Kassis
- Style: Archbishop His Eminence

Information
- Cathedral: Cathedral of Saint Ephrem the Syrian, Aleppo

Website
- https://alepposuryoye.org/

The Syriac Orthodox Archdiocese of Aleppo and Environs is a nominally Metropolitan Archeparchy of the Syriac Orthodox Church in Syria. It serves the governorates of Aleppo, Idlib, Raqqa, and Latakia. The incumbent metropolitan of Aleppo is Mor Boutros Kassis.

== History ==
Aleppo was an important centre for Non-Chalcedonian Christianity following the Council of Chalcedon in 451. Bishop Peter of Aleppo supported Philoxenus of Mabbug at the Synod of Sidon in 511 and the bishop Antoninus was exiled in 518 by Emperor Justin I alongside Severus of Antioch and other miaphysite bishops. The city had a Syriac Orthodox archbishop from 543 onwards. Matthew was bishop of Aleppo in 644–669. Bacchus, bishop of Aleppo, died in 798. Solomon was bishop of Aleppo in 798. John was bishop of Aleppo in 807.

Daniel of the Monastery of the Arabs was ordained as bishop of Aleppo by Patriarch Quriaqos of Tagrit (r. 793–817). Sergius, from the Monastery of Siagta, was ordained as bishop of Aleppo by Patriarch John IV (r. 847–874). Abraham of the Mountain of Edessa was ordained as bishop of Aleppo by Patriarch Ignatius II (r. 878–883). Job of the Monastery of Bizona was ordained as bishop of Aleppo by Patriarch John V (r. 910–922). Abraham, from the Monastery of Mar Iohannan, was ordained as bishop of Aleppo by Patriarch Basil I (r. 923–935). Anastasius, from the Monastery of Mar Siméon, was ordained as bishop of Aleppo by Patriarch John VI (r. 936–953). Sergius was ordained as bishop of Aleppo by Patriarch John VII Sarigta (r. 965–985). Gabriel, from the Monastery of Mar Salomon, was ordained as bishop of Aleppo by Patriarch Athanasius IV Salhoyo (r. 983–1003). Sergius of the Monastery of Ḥabib was ordained as bishop of Aleppo by Patriarch John IX bar ʿAbdun (r. 1049–1057). Patriarch John IX bar ʿAbdun also later ordained Iwannis of the Monastery of Ḥabib as bishop of Aleppo. Gregorius Simon of Edessa was ordained as bishop of Aleppo by Patriarch Basil II (r. 1074–1075) and died between 1124 and 1136.

Ignatius of Edessa was ordained as bishop of Aleppo by Patriarch Athanasius VII bar Qatra (r. 1138–1166). He gave last rites to the imprisoned Count Joscelin II of Edessa in May 1159. Dionysius Mubarak of Edessa was bishop of Aleppo in 1178. Basilius Constantine of Edessa was bishop of Aleppo after 1178 until before 1194/1195. At this time, the diocese of Aleppo was a suffragan of the Archdiocese of Melitene. Dionysius, son of Jeremy of Melitene, was bishop of Aleppo until he was transferred to Melitene in 1222. Gregorius may have been bishop of Aleppo in 1231. Dionysius, son of Jeremy of Melitene, returned to Aleppo in 1232 and died in 1246. Gregorius Barhebraeus was bishop of Aleppo in c. 1253–1264. Michael, bishop of Aleppo, is attested in 1298.

The Syriac Orthodox community at Aleppo is not mentioned again until the beginning of the 16th century, at which time the Church of the Mother of God is first attested in the Christian quarter of Al-Jdayde at Aleppo. John was bishop of Aleppo in c. 1509. Aleppo, alongside Damascus and Hama, was included in the title of Grigorios Yawseph the Iberian, metropolitan of Jerusalem in 1515–1537. Dionysius Isaac was bishop of Aleppo in 1553. 1 priest and 5 deacons were ordained for the Church of the Mother of God at Aleppo in 1584–1590. Basil was bishop of Aleppo in 1598. The Church of the Mother of God at Aleppo served as the seat of the diocese.

Dionysius Constantine al-Mansuri was bishop of Aleppo in 1602–1632. Dionysius Tuma (Thomas) served as bishop in Aleppo in 1650–1653. He was succeeded in 1653 by Dionysius Murad, son of ‘Abd al-‘Aziz al-Dabbagh al-Halili, who served as metropolitan of Aleppo until 1656. By the 1660s, approximately 75 percent of the 5000 Syriac Orthodox Christians at Aleppo had converted to Catholicism. Dionysius Amr Allah, metropolitan of Aleppo in 1680–1707, moved to Damascus due to the lack of Syriac Orthodox Christians at Aleppo. Most of the Syriac Catholics at Aleppo returned to the Syriac Orthodox Church after the death of Patriarch Ignatius Gregory Peter VI Shahbaddin in 1702.

Dionysius Shukrallah was ordained as metropolitan of Aleppo by Maphrian Basil Isaac in January 1709 at the Church of the Sayyida (Virgin Mary) at Aleppo and he served until his ascension as patriarch of Antioch in 1722/1723. (Note: Shukrallah's ascension as patriarch is placed in 1722, or 1723.) Dionysius George was metropolitan of Aleppo from his ordination by Patriarch Ignatius Shukrallah II in 1727 until he was proclaimed as patriarch of Antioch in 1745. The church of Aleppo had 12 priests in 1739. Dionysius Shukr Allah, metropolitan of Aleppo in 1746–1748, was ordained by Patriarch Ignatius George III at the great church of Amid. Patriarch Ignatius George III appointed Mikha’il Jarwa as his deputy for the vacant diocese of Aleppo in 1758. Mikha’il Jarwa was ordained as metropolitan of Aleppo by Patriarch Ignatius George III on 23 February 1766 at the church of Amid with the name Dionysius. Dionysius Mikha’il Jarwa was metropolitan of Aleppo until he formally joined the Syriac Catholic Church in 1775. Almost all of the Syriac Orthodox Christians at Aleppo consequently followed Dionysius Mikha’il Jarwa in converting to Catholicism. Patriarch Ignatius George IV ordained Dionysius ‘Abd Allah Shidyaq as metropolitan of Aleppo at the end of 1777 and he served until 1785.

The diocese was merged with the Archdiocese of Syria in 1817. From 1890, about 425 Syriac Orthodox families from Urfa moved to Aleppo and established the Old Syriac Quarter. (Note: (Arabic: Ḥayy al-Suryān al-Qadīm).) There were 50 Syriac Orthodox Christians at Aleppo and 500 in the diocese in the first decade of the 20th century. In the Ottoman provincial yearbook of 1908, it is recorded that 1852 Syriac Orthodox Christians inhabited the province of Aleppo.

In the aftermath of the Sayfo, 1160 Syriac Orthodox families from Mardin, Tur Abdin, and Diyarbakır took refuge in the Sulemanye quarter of Aleppo. In February–March 1924, the entire Syriac Orthodox population of Urfa fled to Aleppo. The Church of Saint Ephrem was consecrated in 1925 by Patriarch Ignatius Elias III. The archdiocese was re-established in 1926. The Church of Saint George in the Old Syriac Quarter of Aleppo was constructed and consecrated in 1932. (Note: Dinno places the consecration of the Mar Jirjis Church in 1952.) Some 50 Syriac Orthodox families moved from Aleppo to Beirut in 1932–1933. By 1998, the archdiocese served 20,000–25,000 Syriac Orthodox Christians and had 6 parishes, including 3 in Aleppo, one in Al-Tabqah, one in Raqqa, and one in Latakia. There were 15,000 Syriac Orthodox Christians in the archdiocese in 2003. St Mary's Church was constructed in the New Syriac Quarter of Aleppo in the 2000s. By 2005, the archdiocese had 5 clergy, all of whom were located at Aleppo. Prior to the Syrian civil war, an estimated 10,000 Syriac Orthodox Christians inhabited Aleppo, of whom 1000 families were members of St George’s Church and 1200 families were members of the Cathedral of Saint Ephrem. Construction of the Church of the Virgin Mary at Latakia began in 2019.

== Ecclesiastical properties ==
The following ecclesiastical properties belong to the archdiocese:

- Cathedral of Saint Ephrem, Sulaymāniyya district, Aleppo.
- Church of Saint George (Mār Jirjis), Old Syriac Quarter, Aleppo.
- Church of Our Lady of the Syriacs (Sayyidat al-Suryān), New Syriac Quarter, (Note: (Arabic: Ḥayy al-Suryān al-Jadīd).) Aleppo.

== List of archbishops ==
The following is a list of incumbents of the see following the restoration of the archdiocese:

- Clemens Yohannes (1926–1928)
- Athanasios Thoma Qasir (1929–1933)
- Gregorius Gibrail (1937–1943)
- Dionysios Girgis Behnam (1950–1979)
- Gregorius Yohanna Ibrahim (1979–2022) (Note: Gregorius Yohanna Ibrahim was kidnapped in April 2013. Boutros Kassis was appointed as patriarchal vicar of Aleppo in 2019. The seat was declared vacant in 2022.)
- Boutros Kassis (2022–present)

== Bibliography ==
- Barsoum, Aphrem (2003). The Scattered Pearls: A History of Syriac Literature and Sciences. Translated by Matti Moosa (2nd ed.). Gorgias Press.
- Barsoum, Aphrem (2008). History of the Za'faran Monastery. Translated by Matti Moosa. Gorgias Press.
- Barsoum, Aphrem (2009). History of the Syriac Dioceses. Vol. 1. Translated by Matti Moosa. Gorgias Press.
- Bcheiry, Iskandar (2010). A List of Syriac Orthodox Ecclesiastic Ordinations from the Sixteenth and Seventeenth Century: The Syriac Manuscript of Hunt 444 (Syr 68 in Bodleian Library, Oxford). Gorgias Press.
- Burleson, Samuel; Rompay, Lucas van (2011). "List of Patriarchs of the Main Syriac Churches in the Middle East". Gorgias Encyclopedic Dictionary of the Syriac Heritage. Piscataway, NJ: Gorgias Press. pp. 481–491.
- Chabot, Jean-Baptiste, ed. (1905). Chronique de Michel le Syrien (in French). Vol. III. Paris: Ernest Leroux.
- Chaillot, Christine (1998). The Syrian Orthodox Church of Antioch and All the East: A Brief Introduction to Its Life and Spirituality.
- Dinno, Khalid S. (2017). The Syrian Orthodox Christians in the Late Ottoman Period and Beyond: Crisis then Revival. Gorgias Press.
- Fiey, Jean Maurice (1993). Pour un Oriens Christianus Novus: Répertoire des diocèses syriaques orientaux et occidentaux (in French).
- Jarjour, Tala (2018). Sense and Sadness: Syriac Chant in Aleppo. Oxford University Press.
- Joseph, John (1983). Muslim-Christian Relations and Inter-Christian Rivalries in the Middle East: The Case of the Jacobites in an Age of Transition. State University of New York Press.
- Nicholson, Robert Lawrence (1973). Joscelyn III and the Fall of the Crusader States, 1134–1199. Brill.
- Takahashi, Hidemi (2011). "Aleppo". In Sebastian P. Brock; Aaron M. Butts; George A. Kiraz; Lucas Van Rompay (eds.). Gorgias Encyclopedic Dictionary of the Syriac Heritage. Gorgias Press. pp. 14–16.
- Wilmshurst, David (2019). "West Syrian patriarchs and maphrians". In Daniel King (ed.). The Syriac World. Routledge. pp. 806–813.
