= Syriac Catholic cathedral =

Syriac Catholic cathedral may refer to:

== Syria ==
- Syriac Catholic Cathedral of Saint Paul, Damascus
- Cathedral of Our Lady of the Assumption, Aleppo

== See also ==
- Syriac Catholic Church
