= Ignatius Philip I Arkus =

Head of the Syriac Catholic Church from 1866 to 1874

Mar Ignatius Philip I Arkus
- Patriarch of Antioch
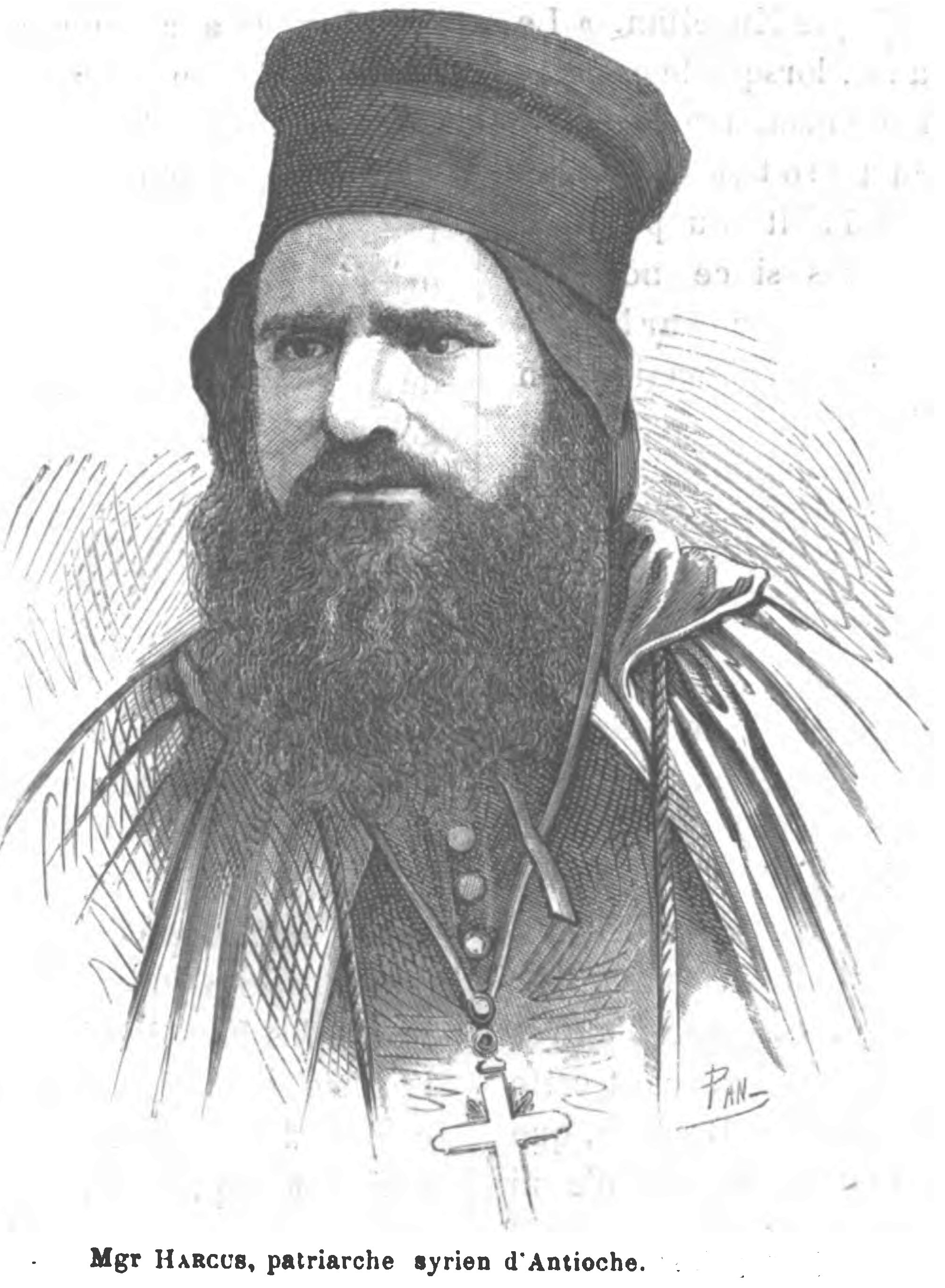
- Church: Syriac Catholic Church
- See: Patriarch of Antioch
- Installed: 24 May 1866
- Term ended: 7 March 1874
- Predecessor: Ignatius Antony I Samheri
- Successor: Ignatius George V Shelhot

Orders
- Ordination: 1850 (Priest)
- Consecration: 28 July 1862 (Bishop) by Antony I Samheri

Personal details
- Born: Sa'id Arkus; 11 April 1827 Amid, Turkey
- Died: 7 March 1874 (aged 46) Mardin, Turkey
- Residence: Mardin

Mar Ignatius Philip I Arkus (or Arqous, Harcus, Arcous, 1827–1874) was patriarch of the Syriac Catholic Church from 1866 to 1874.

== Life ==
Philip Arkus was born in Amid on 11 April 1827 (on 30 March according to the Julian Calendar used by the Syriac Catholic Church up to 1836). He was sent to study in the patriarchal seminary of Charfeh in Lebanon and was ordained priest in 1850. On 28 July 1862 he was consecrated bishop by Patriarch Ignatius Antony I Samheri and appointed bishop of Amid (i.e. Diyarbakır).

At the death of Patriarch Ignatius Antony I Samheri on 16 June 1864, the Congregation Propaganda Fide of Rome asked that the new patriarch should live in Mardin where was the traditional See of the Syriac Patriarch of Antioch. Because of a pestilence the electoral synod could be summoned only in 1866 in Aleppo, and when three metropolitans declined not to go to live in the cold Mardin, Philip Arkus was elected patriarch (21 May 1866). He was enthroned Sunday 24 May 1866, and soon traveled to Rome where he was confirmed by Pope Pius IX on 3 August of the same year.

Philip Arkus was a poor leader without the energy and the strength of his predecessor. The Syriac Catholic Church suffered of a period of problems, due to the too high number of bishops and to some cases of misconduct.

Philip Arkus did not keep a clear position towards the attempts of Pius IX to decide the appointments of bishops in the Eastern Catholic Churches. While the Chaldean patriarch Joseph VI Audo and the Melkite patriarch Gregory II Youssef, as well as the Armenian Catholic Church, reacted fiercely and later obtained substantial changes, Philip Arkus pretended initially not to have received any instruction from Rome.

In this climate Philip Arkus went to Rome to attend the First Vatican Council (together with other six Syriac Catholic bishops: Behnam Benni of Mosul, George Shelhot of Aleppo, Athanase Jarkhi of Baghdad, Flavien-Pierre Matah, and other two bishops converted from the Syriac Orthodox Church). In Rome, not to be forced to take a position on the issue of the appointment of the bishops, he offered his resignation as patriarch that was rejected by the Pope. Throughout his staying in Rome, Philip Arkus, probably already ill, did not participate to the works of the Council nor to the liturgies. When back home, in 1872 he ordained a bishop without the previous approval from the Pope.

Philip Arkus died in Mardin on 7 March 1874.

== Sources ==
- Frazee, Charles A. (2006) [1983]. Catholics and Sultans: The Church and the Ottoman Empire 1453-1923. Cambridge: Cambridge University Press. ISBN 9780521027007.
