= Ignatius Ephrem II Rahmani =

Head of the Syriac Catholic Church from 1898 to 1929

Mar Ignatius Ephrem II Rahmani
- Patriarch of Antioch
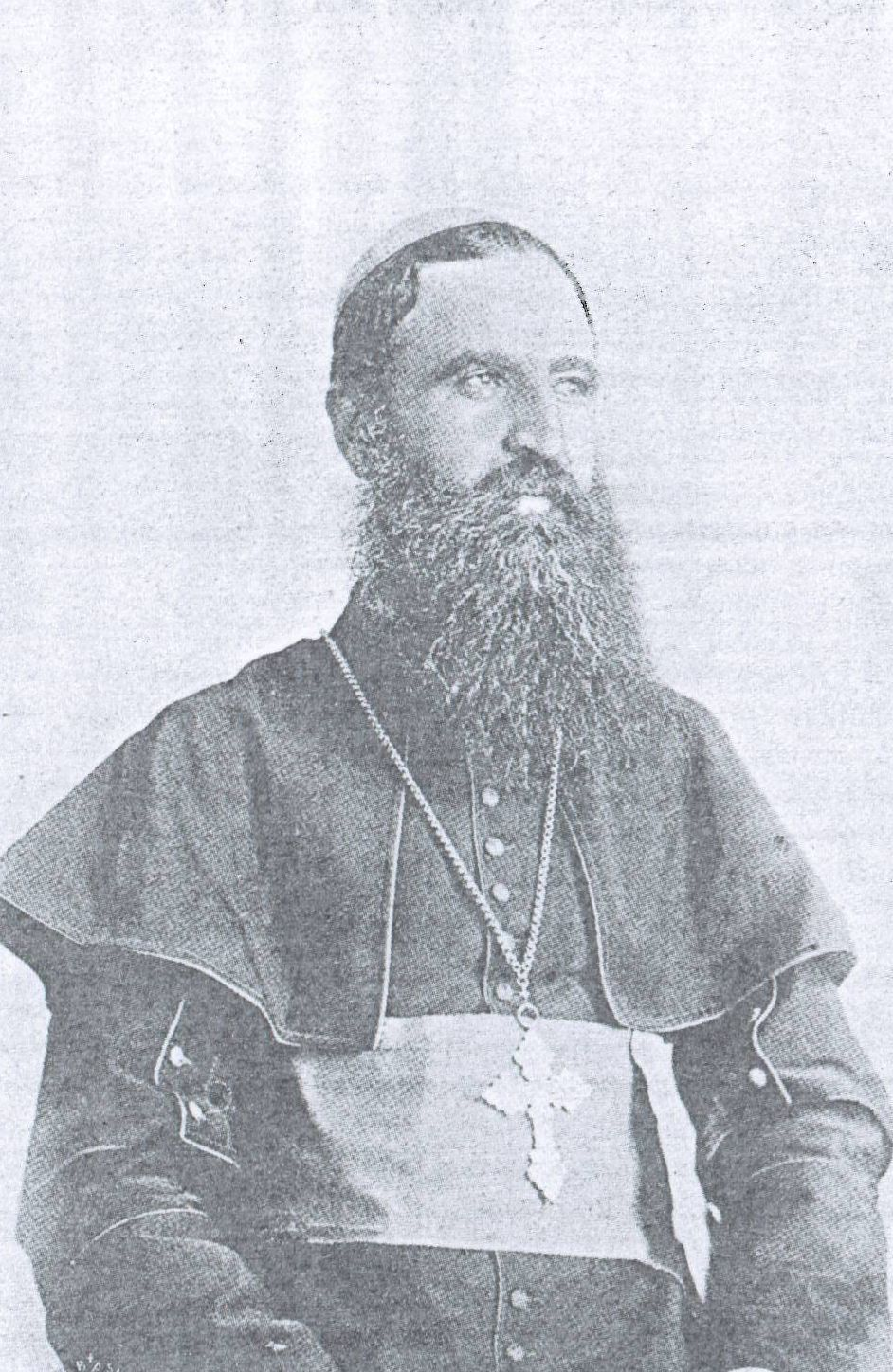
- Church: Syriac Catholic Church
- See: Patriarch of Antioch
- Installed: 9 October 1898
- Term ended: 7 May 1929
- Predecessor: Ignatius Behnam II Benni
- Successor: Ignatius Gabriel I Tappuni

Orders
- Ordination: April 1873 (Priest)
- Consecration: 2 Oct 1887 (Bishop) by George V Shelhot

Personal details
- Born: Ephrem Rahmani; 21 November 1848 Mosul, Iraq
- Died: 7 May 1929 (aged 80) Cairo, Egypt
- Residence: Beirut

Mar Ignatius Dionysius Ephrem II Rahmani (21 November 1848 – 7 May 1929) was patriarch of the Syriac Catholic Church from 1898 to 1929 and a Syriac scholar.

== Life ==
Ephrem Rahmani was born on 21 November 1848 (or on 9 November 1849 according to other sources) in Mosul. He studied with the Dominican friars in Mosul and later in the College of the Propaganda in Rome and was ordained priest in April 1873.

Rahmani was appointed vicar to the bishop of Mosul with the titular title of bishop of Edessa and consecrated bishop on 2 October 1887 by Patriarch Ignatius George V Shelhot. On 1 May 1894 Rahmani was appointed bishop of Aleppo. After the death of Ignatius Behnam II Benni (13 September 1897) he was elected patriarch on 9 October 1898 and confirmed by Pope Leo XIII on 28 November 1898.

As patriarch Rahmani was particularly interested in the instruction of the clergy. The early 20th-century was a period of expansion for the Syriac Catholic Church who received many Syriac Orthodox converts. In 1910 he moved the patriarchal see from Mardin to Beirut.

The arrival of World War I was catastrophic: the Armenian genocide brought destruction also to the Christian Syrians who lived in the same areas as the Armenians, with the result that the Syriac Catholic Church had the number of its members cut by half with five dioceses (of ten) and fifteen missions destroyed.

Ephrem Rahmani died in Cairo on 7 May 1929.

== Works ==
Ephrem Rahmani was a liturgical scholar of international repute. In 1899 he discovered and published the first edition of the 4th-century text Testamentum Domini. His main contribution on the history of the liturgy is his book Les Liturgies Orientales et Occidentales, Beyrouth, 1929.

== Sources ==
- Frazee, Charles A. (2006) [1983]. Catholics and Sultans: The Church and the Ottoman Empire 1453-1923. Cambridge: Cambridge University Press. ISBN 9780521027007.
