= Basilios Isaac Joubeir =

Head of the Syriac Catholic Church from 1704 to 1721

Basil Ishaq ibn Jubair (or Isaac Basilios Joubeir, c. 1645–1721) was the maphrian and Archbishop of Nineveh. He converted to Eastern Catholicism and saw the turbulent times of the attempts of union of the Syriac Orthodox Church with the Church of Rome during the reigns of the Syriac patriarchs of Antioch Ignatius Andrew Akijan (1662–1677) and Ignatius Gregory Peter VI Shahbaddin (1679–1702).

After Patriarch Shahbaddin's arrest by the Ottoman authorities and eventual death in prison on 4 March 1702, on 23 November 1703, Isaac Basilios Joubeir was elected as new Patriarch. Joubeir was at the time in Istanbul in the French consulate. He was later confirmed as Patriarch on 17 November 1704 by Rome.

But Joubeir did not accept the title of patriarch and considered himself only as Maphrian, waiting for a "better time". In 1706 he moved to Rome where he died on 18 May 1721.

The Syriac Catholic Church had a new patriarch only in 1783 with Ignatius Michael III Jarweh.
