= List of Syriac Catholic patriarchs of Antioch =

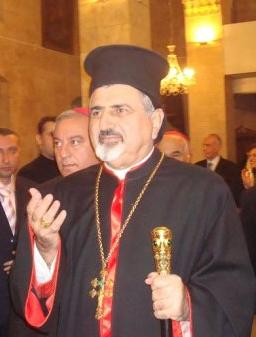
Current Patriarch of Antioch, Ignatius Joseph III Yonan

The Syriac Catholic Patriarch of Antioch is the head of the Syriac Catholic Church. According to tradition, the patriarchate of Antioch was established by Saint Peter in the 1st century AD, but split into two separate lines of patriarchs after the deposition of Patriarch Severus of Antioch in 518 over the issue of the Council of Chalcedon of 451. The non-Chalcedonian supporters of Severus went on to form what is now known as the Syriac Orthodox Church, whilst the Chalcedonians developed the church now known as the Greek Orthodox Church of Antioch.

The office was established with the election of Ignatius Andrew Akijan in 1662 as patriarch of Antioch, thereby creating a separate line of patriarchs in full communion with the Catholic Church, in opposition to the Syriac Orthodox Church. Despite initial success, after the death of Ignatius Gregory Peter VI Shahbaddin in 1701 or 1702, most Syriac Catholics returned to the Syriac Orthodox Church, and the office lay vacant until the election of Ignatius Michael III Jarweh in 1782, from which a permanent line of Syriac Catholic patriarchs sprang.

The following is a list of all the incumbents of the office of Syriac Catholic Patriarch of Antioch.

== List of patriarchs ==
=== Syriac Catholic patriarchs from 1662 to present ===
Unless otherwise stated, all information is from the Gorgias Encyclopedic Dictionary of the Syriac Heritage, and the list provided in The Syriac World, as noted in the bibliography below.

- Ignatius Andrew Akijan (1662–1677/1678)
- Ignatius Gregory Peter VI Shahbaddin (1678–1701/1702)

Isaac Basilios Joubeir (Note: Isaac Basilios Joubeir was selected as patriarch of Antioch, but he refused to accept the office.)
vacant (1701/1702–1782)

- Ignatius Michael III Jarweh (1782–1800)

vacant (1800–1802)

- Ignatius Michael IV Daher (1802–1810)

vacant (1810–1814)

- Ignatius Simon II Hindi Zora (1814–1818)

vacant (1818–1820)

- Ignatius Peter VII Jarweh (1820–1851)

vacant (1851–1852/1853)

- Ignatius Antony I Samheri (1852/1853–1864)

vacant (1864–1866)

- Ignatius Philip I Arkus (1866–1874)
- Ignatius George V Shelhot (1874–1891)

vacant (1891–1893)

- Ignatius Behnam II Benni (1893–1897)
- Ignatius Ephrem II Rahmani (1898–1929)
- Ignatius Gabriel I Tappouni (1929–1968)
- Ignatius Antony II Hayyek (1968–1998)
- Ignatius Moses I Daoud (1998–2001)
- Ignatius Peter VIII Abdalahad (2001–2008)
- Ignatius Joseph III Yonan (2009–present)

== See also ==
- Council of Catholic Patriarchs of the East

== Bibliography ==
- Burleson, Samuel; Van Rompay, Lucas (2011). "List of Patriarchs: II. The Syriac Orthodox Church and its Uniate continuations". In Sebastian P. Brock; Aaron M. Butts; George A. Kiraz; Lucas Van Rompay (eds.). Gorgias Encyclopedic Dictionary of the Syriac Heritage: Electronic Edition. Gorgias Press.
- Harrak, Amir (2011). "Syriac Catholic Church". In Sebastian P. Brock; Aaron M. Butts; George A. Kiraz; Lucas Van Rompay (eds.). Gorgias Encyclopedic Dictionary of the Syriac Heritage: Electronic Edition. Gorgias Press.
- Joseph, John (1983). Muslim-Christian Relations and Inter-Christian Rivalries in the Middle East: The Case of the Jacobites in an Age of Transition. State University of New York Press.
- Wilmshurst, David (2019). "West Syrian patriarchs and maphrians". In Daniel King (ed.). The Syriac World. Routledge. pp. 806–813.
