= Ignatius Behnam II Benni =

Head of the Syriac Catholic Church from 1893 to 1897

Mor Ignatius Behnam II Benni
- Patriarch of Antioch
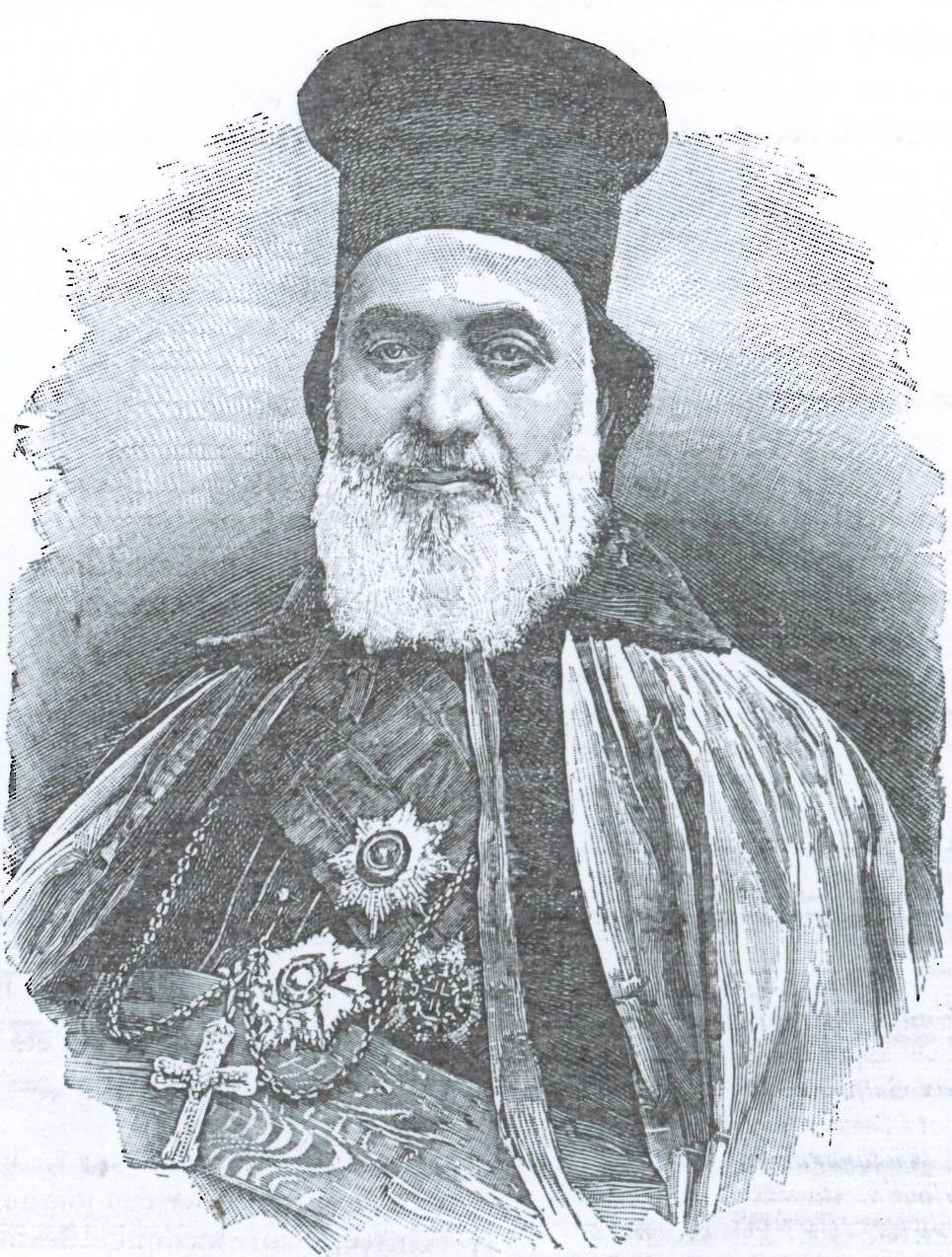
- Church: Syriac Catholic Church
- See: Patriarch of Antioch
- Installed: 15 October 1893
- Term ended: 13 September 1897
- Predecessor: Ignatius George V Shelhot
- Successor: Ignatius Ephrem II Rahmani

Orders
- Ordination: 16 March 1856 (Priest)
- Consecration: 9 March 1862 (Bishop) by Antony I Samheri

Personal details
- Born: Behnam Benni; 14 August 1831 Mosul, Baghdad Eyalet, Ottoman Iraq
- Died: 13 September 1897 (aged 66) Mosul, Mosul Vilayet, Ottoman Iraq
- Residence: Mardin and Mosul

Mor Ignatius Behnam II Benni (1831–1897) was patriarch of the Syriac Catholic Church from 1893 to 1897.

== Life ==
Behnam Benni was born on 14 August 1831 (Julian Calendar) near Mosul in Ottoman Iraq. In 1847 he was admitted in the College of the Propaganda in Rome where he remained till 1856 when he received the Doctorate in Theology. He was ordained deacon on 8 March 1856 and priest on 16 March 1856.

Behnam Benni served as priest for some years until his appointment as bishop of Mosul by Patriarch Ignatius Antony I Samheri who consecrated him bishop on 9 March 1862. His first years at Mosul were saddened by the fight with Syriac Orthodox for the ownership of the churches in the town. In 1870 Benni was in Rome to participate to the First Vatican Council where he, in opposition to the Melkite patriarch Gregory II Youssef, spoke to make uniform the ecclesiastical discipline in the East and in the West and in favor of the papal infallibility. He was one of the main redactors of the text approved by the synod of Charfet in 1888 that made mandatory the clergy's celibacy in the Syriac Catholic Church.

After the death of patriarch Ignatius George V Shelhot on 8 December 1891, Behnam Benni, who was the older prelate by consecration, was appointed Locum tenens of the patriarchate. On 12 October 1893 he was unanimously elected patriarch, confirmed the same day by Pope Leo XIII by means of a telegraph message and enthroned Sunday 15 October 1893. He was formally confirmed by the pope in the consistory of 18 May 1894.

In 1894 Behnam Benni and the Mekite patriarch Gregory Youssef went to Rome on invitation of Pope Leo XIII for a conference on the Eastern Catholic Churches that led to the approbation of the papal encyclical Orientalium dignitas on 30 November 1894, thus confirming the role and autonomy of the Eastern Catholic Churches.

Behnam Benni died in Mosul on 13 September 1897.

== Works ==
Behnam Benni, with Joseph David, was the author of the book The Tradition of the Syriac Church of Antioch: Concerning the Primacy and the Prerogatives of St. Peter and of His Successors the Roman Pontiffs translated in English by Joseph Gagliardi and published in London in 1871
