= Ignatius Shukrallah II =

108th Patriarch of the Syriac Orthodox Church of Antioch (1722–1745)

- Syriac Orthodox Patriarch of Antioch and All the East
- Church: Syriac Orthodox Church
- See: Antioch
- Installed: 1722
- Term ended: 1745
- Predecessor: Ignatius Isaac II
- Successor: Ignatius George III

Personal details
- Born: c. 1674 Mardin, Ottoman Empire
- Died: 15 September 1745

Ignatius Shukrallah II was the Patriarch of Antioch and head of the Syriac Orthodox Church from 1722 until his death in 1745.

== Biography ==
Shukrallah was born at Mardin in c. 1674 and was the son of Maqdisi Yuhanna, son of Ni’ma Sani’a. He became a monk at the nearby Monastery of Saint Ananias, where he was educated in church sciences and studied under the maphrian Basil Isaac. Shukrallah was later ordained as a priest by Isaac and accompanied the latter on his journey to Constantinople in 1701 to gain permission from the Ottoman government to rebuild the churches of Mardin. After Isaac had been granted a firman from the Ottoman government recognising his election to the patriarchal office, Shukrallah was consecrated as metropolitan bishop of Aleppo at the Church of the Virgin Mary at Aleppo by Isaac in January 1709 with the name Dionysius.

On the instruction of Isaac, Shukrallah regulated the table of movable and immovable feasts to determine the dates of Lent and of movable major feasts with the Chorepiscopus Economus Yuhanna, son of Maqdisi Mansur of Homs, likely in 1714. In 1717, Shukrallah rendered his help to Gregorius Simon, metropolitan bishop of Jerusalem, in the affairs of the diocese and the Monastery of Saint Mark, and thus he and his students, the monks Wanes of Gargar, Yuhanna, ‘Abd al-Nur of Amid, and Ni’mat Allah, departed for Jerusalem on 13 December. Whilst at Jerusalem, at the request of Roman Catholic friars, Shukrallah wrote a treatise in which he detailed the union of the two natures of Christ. Consequently, the friars conspired against Shukrallah and he, alongside the monks Yuhanna, ‘Abd al-Nur of Amid, and Musa ibn Kuhayl of Sadad, was subsequently banished to the island of Arwad for four months on the orders of the governor Recep Pasha in July 1720.

After Isaac's resignation as patriarch due to ill health, Shukrallah was elected and then ordained as the former's successor with Isaac's approval at a synod at the Monastery of Saint Ananias headed by Basil Simon II, maphrian of Tur Abdin, on 20 July 1722. (Note: Shukrallah's ascension as patriarch is placed in 1722, or 1723.) Shukrallah received the decree of investiture from the Ottoman Sultan Ahmed III in the following year, dated 6 Rabi’ al-Akhir 1135 AH, addressed to the qadi (judge) of Hisn Kayfa so as to exempt the Monastery of Saint Cyriacus near Zarjal from fees and tithes. In this year he also convened a synod at Amid to regulate the document of faith. As patriarch, Shukrallah largely resided at Amid, where he came into conflict with the Chaldean Catholic Patriarch Joseph III who was imprisoned and exiled by the Ottoman government following Shukrallah's complaints. The deacon Saliba, son of Tumajan of Edessa, was appointed to serve as Shukrallah's deputy at Constantinople.

In 1723, Shukrallah aided Basilius Gurgis, metropolitan bishop of Bushairiyya, in the construction of the Monastery of Saint Cyriacus at Bushairiyya. He acted to ensure the rights of the Church of Saint Thomas at Quṭurbul near Amid were legally registered in 1725 and again in 1729. The church, sanctuary, and patriarchal chapel at the Monastery of Saint Ananias were renovated in 1727–1728; he also restored its vineyards and orchards of figs, almonds, pears, mulberries, and pomegranates and constructed stone hedges around them. The monastery's tithes were revived and arranged to be collected by the Church of Qal’at al-Imra’a and a deputy was appointed to collect the fees of religious services and the church's endowments. After this, Shukrallah undertook a pastoral visit to Mosul, the Monastery of Saint Matthew, the Monastery of Saint Behnam, and Bushairiyya in 1728.

At great expense, he financed the translation of a number of Syriac theological books into Arabic by the monk ‘Abd al-Nur, son of Ni’mat Allah of Amid, including the works of Moses bar Kepha, namely his treatises on the soul, resurrection, paradise, and angels, and also a treatise on devils by John of Dara; this was completed in 1729 and circulated amongst the clergy. In the same year, he built and consecrated the Church of Saint Theodorus at Mansuriyya near Mardin with the aid of Timothy ‘Isa of Mosul, metropolitan bishop of Mardin. He also renovated the Monastery of the Prophet Elijah at Qanqart near Amid. (Note: The restoration of the Monastery of the Prophet Elijah at Qanqart took place in either 1724–1725, 1730, or 1734–1735.)

At Qaraqosh, Shukrallah built the churches of Saints Zaina and Andrew in 1738 with the assistance of the priest ‘Abd al-Masih of Khudayda. A second decree of investiture was obtained, dated 24 June 1739 (24 Shawwal 1141 AH), addressed to the wali (governor) and qadi of Damascus with the purpose of protecting the Monastery of Saint Elian near Al-Qaryatayn in Syria against acts of aggression. The Church of Saint Saba at Khankah was rebuilt in 1742 by Shukrallah. In 1744, he renovated the Church of Saints Sergius and Bacchus at Qaraqosh with Iyawannis Karas, metropolitan bishop of the Monastery of Saint Behnam, as well as the Church of Saint Thomas and Church of the Virgin Mary at Mosul, and the Church of Saint George at Randwan. At Sadad, the Church of Saint Theodorus was rebuilt by Shukrallah in 1745.

Shukrallah died on 15 September 1745 and was buried next to the tomb of the Patriarch Ignatius Abdulmasih I in a common cemetery outside the Rum Gate of Amid. Gregorius Tuma, metropolitan bishop of Jerusalem, performed Shukrallah's funeral service.

== Works ==
Shukrallah composed 24 homilies in Arabic during his tenure as metropolitan bishop of Aleppo and patriarch of Antioch as well as some zajaliyyat.

== Episcopal succession ==
As patriarch, Shukrallah ordained the following bishops:

1. Dioscorus ‘Abd al-Nur, metropolitan of the Monastery of St. Moses the Abyssinian (1725)
2. Dioscorus Sarukhan, ecumenical bishop (1727)
3. Gregorius Li’azar, metropolitan bishop of the Monastery of Saint Matthew (1728)
4. Julius Barsoum Sani’a, ecumenical metropolitan of the Patriarchal office (1729)
5. Cyril Gurgis Sani’a, ecumenical metropolitan bishop (1730)
6. Basil Lazarus IV, Maphrian of the East (1730)
7. Iyawannis Tuma, ecumenical bishop and then bishop of Damascus (1730)
8. Athanasius Tuma, ecumenical metropolitan bishop (1731)
9. Gregorius Boghos, ecumenical metropolitan bishop (1732)
10. Cyril Faraj Allah, metropolitan bishop of Maʿdan (1732)
11. Cyril Jirjis, metropolitan bishop of the Monastery of Saint Elian (1737)
12. Cyril Jirjis, metropolitan bishop of Hattack (1737)
13. Severus ‘Abd al-Ahad, metropolitan bishop of Edessa (1738)
14. Iyawannis Yuhanna, ecumenical metropolitan bishop (1740)
15. Basil Denha, Maphrian of Tur Abdin (1740)
16. Dioscorus Shukr Allah, metropolitan bishop of Jazirat ibn ‘Umar (1743/1745)
17. Bulus, metropolitan of Maʿdan (1745)
18. Cyril Yuhanna, ecumenical metropolitan bishop (1745)

== Bibliography ==
- Barsoum, Aphrem (2003). The Scattered Pearls: A History of Syriac Literature and Sciences. Translated by Matti Moosa (2nd ed.). Gorgias Press.
- Barsoum, Aphrem (2008). History of the Za'faran Monastery. Translated by Matti Moosa. Gorgias Press.
- Barsoum, Aphrem (2009a). History of the Syriac Dioceses. Vol. 1. Translated by Matti Moosa. Gorgias Press.
- Barsoum, Aphrem (2009b). The Collected Historical Essays of Aphram I Barsoum. Vol. 1. Translated by Matti Moosa. Gorgias Press.
- Burleson, Samuel; Van Rompay, Lucas (2011). "List of Patriarchs: II. The Syriac Orthodox Church and its Uniate continuations". In Sebastian P. Brock; Aaron M. Butts; George A. Kiraz; Lucas Van Rompay (eds.). Gorgias Encyclopedic Dictionary of the Syriac Heritage: Electronic Edition. Gorgias Press.
- Ignatius Jacob III (2008). History of the Monastery of Saint Matthew in Mosul. Translated by Matti Moosa. Gorgias Press.
- Wilmshurst, David (2019). "West Syrian patriarchs and maphrians". In Daniel King (ed.). The Syriac World. Routledge. pp. 806–813.

Preceded by Ignatius Isaac II	Syriac Orthodox Patriarch of Antioch; 1722–1745	Succeeded by Ignatius George III
