= Ignatius Peter VII Jarweh =

Head of the Syriac Catholic Church from 1820 to 1851

Mar Ignatius Peter VII Jarweh
- Patriarch of Antioch
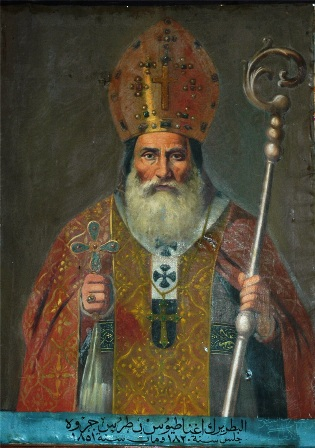
- Church: Syriac Catholic Church
- See: Patriarch of Antioch
- Installed: 25 February 1820
- Term ended: 16 October 1851
- Predecessor: Ignatius Simon II Hindi Zora
- Successor: Ignatius Antony I Samheri

Personal details
- Born: Peter Jarweh; 9 July 1777
- Died: 16 October 1851 (aged 74)
- Residence: Charfet, Mount Lebanon

Mar Ignatius Peter VII Jarweh (or Butrus Javré, Jaroueh, Garweh, Djarweh, Giarvé, 1777–1851) was patriarch of the Syriac Catholic Church from 1820 to 1851.

== Life ==
Peter Jarweh was born on 9 July 1777 in Aleppo. He was a relative of Patriarch Ignatius Michael III Jarweh, who took care of his education. He was ordained priest on 12 June 1802 and visited Rome in 1805–1806. On 14 September 1810 he was ordained bishop of Jerusalem.

In 1818, after a contact with the Protestant missionary W. Jowett, he went to Europe to raise funds: in London the Church Missionary Society gave him 10,000 francs, and in Paris Louis XVIII gave him another 8,000 francs. With this amount he bought a printing press and took it to the Charfet monastery (the patriarchal see) in Lebanon in order to print the Bible and other liturgical texts in Arabic.

On 25 February 1820 he was elected patriarch of the Syriac Catholic Church, but Rome was suspicious because of the gift he had received from the Protestant missionaries, and he was confirmed patriarch only on 21 February 1828 by Pope Leo XII after he'd visited Rome in 1825-26.

During his patriarchate the Syriac Catholic Church expanded, particularly in South Lebanon and in the area of Damascus and gained the conversion of some Syriac Orthodox bishops, among them Antony Samheri (bishop of Mardin and future patriarch) and the bishops of Mosul and Homs. In Mosul the Catholic and Orthodox Syriacs shared the same church-buildings but each one had their own priests.

In 1830 the Ottoman Empire recognized the Armenian Catholic Church (that legally included also the Syriac Catholic Church) as a millet, a distinctive religious community within the Empire, thus obtaining civic emancipation for Peter Jarweh's Church from the Syriac Orthodox Church. Having no more to fear from harassment, Peter Jarweh moved the patriarchal See from the Charfet monastery in Lebanon to Aleppo to be closer to his flock. In 1836 he introduced the Gregorian calendar. In 1841 he changed the monastic profession in a simple embrace of the evangelical counsels and he reorganized the seminary of Charfet.

== Death ==
In September 1850 in Aleppo the Muslims attacked the Christians, burning the churches, and Patriarch Peter Jarweh was seriously wounded in the neck. He died on 16 October 1851 (or on 16 November according to other sources).

== Works ==
Peter Jarweh left three books of homilies, and a biography of Patriarch Michael III Jarweh.

== Sources ==
- Frazee, Charles A. (2006) [1983]. Catholics and Sultans: The Church and the Ottoman Empire 1453-1923. Cambridge: Cambridge University Press. ISBN 9780521027007.
