= Ignatius Michael IV Daher =

Head of the Syriac Catholic Church from 1801 to 1810

Mar Ignatius Michael IV Daher
- Patriarch of Antioch
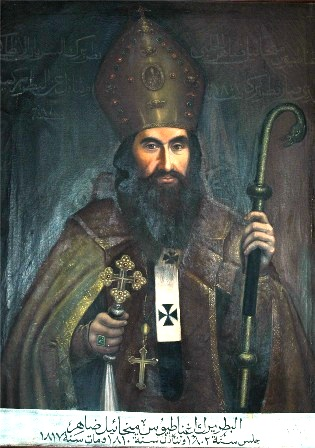
- Church: Syriac Catholic Church
- See: Patriarch of Antioch
- Installed: 20 December 1801
- Term ended: September 1810
- Predecessor: Ignatius Michael III Jarweh
- Successor: Ignatius Simon II Hindi Zora

Orders
- Consecration: May 1802

Personal details
- Born: 1761 Aleppo
- Died: 1816 (aged 54–55)

Mar Ignatius Michael IV Daher (or Zahir, 1761–1816) was the patriarch of the Syriac Catholic Church from 1801 to 1810.

== Life ==
Michael Daher was born in 1761 in Aleppo. Five days after the death of Ignatius Michael III Jarweh the Syriac Catholic synod elected as new patriarch Mar Cyril Bennam, bishop of Mosul, who was absent and immediately resigned. This opened a difficult succession, which ended on December 20, 1801 with the election as Patriarch of Daher, till then responsible for the Catholic Syriac community in Aleppo. Daher was ordained bishop in May 1802 and he received the pallium, the sign of patriarchal authority, from Pope Pius VII on December 20, 1802.

Due to his patriarchal ministry, Daher was required to inhabit in the Patriarchal See of Al-Charfet (or Sharfeh) monastery in Lebanon in place of his preferred town, Aleppo. In 1805 he asked Rome to move the See from Al-Charfet to Aleppo, without success. He was also suspected of embezzling the property of the Al-Charfet monastery. In September 1810 Michael Daher resigned as Patriarch, appointing himself as bishop of Aleppo. Even if the Rome considered these resignations as illegal, they were accepted in 1812.

Daher died in 1816.
