= Ignatius Gabriel I Tappouni =

Head of the Syriac Catholic Church from 1929 to 1968

His Beatitude Mar Ignatius Gabriel I Tappouni
- Cardinal Patriarch of Antioch and all the East of the Syrians
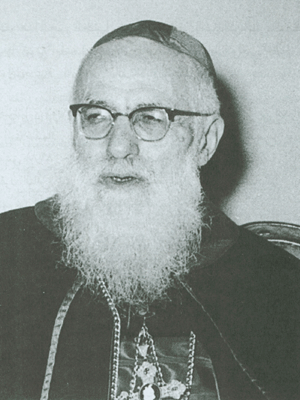
- Church: Syriac Catholic Church
- See: Antioch
- Installed: 15 July 1929
- Term ended: 29 January 1968
- Predecessor: Ignatius Ephrem II Rahmani
- Successor: Ignatius Antony II Hayyek

Orders
- Ordination: 3 November 1902 (Priest)
- Consecration: 19 January 1913 (Bishop) by Ephrem II Rahmani
- Created cardinal: 16 December 1935 by Pope Pius XI
- Rank: Cardinal-Priest (1935-1965); Cardinal-Bishop Patriarch (1965-1968)

Personal details
- Born: Abdul-Ahad Dawood Tappouni; 3 November 1879 Mosul, Iraq
- Died: 29 January 1968 (aged 88) Beirut, Lebanon

Mar Ignatius Gabriel I Tappouni (Arabic: جبرائيل تبّوني, French: Ignace-Gabriel I Tappouni) (3 November 1879 – 29 January 1968) was a leading prelate of the Syriac Catholic Church. He served as Patriarch of Antioch from 1929 to 1968, and was elevated to the cardinalate in 1935.

== Biography ==
Born Abd al-Ahad Dawud Tappouni, baptized as Leo Gabriel, Tappouni was born in Mosul (in modern Iraq) and there studied at the Syro-Chaldean Dominican seminary. He was ordained to the priesthood on 3 November 1902, taking the name Dominic. After teaching at the same seminary until 1908, Tappouni was then made Secretary of the Apostolic Delegation to Mesopotamia.

On 12 September 1912, he was appointed Titular Bishop of Danaba and the Chaldean Apostolic Vicar of Mardin. Tappouni was reassigned as Titular Bishop of Batnae dei Siri on 19 January 1913, which was the same date he received his episcopal consecration from Patriarch Ignatius Ephrem II Rahmani. At his consecration he took the name Theophile Gabriel. During World War I, he was imprisoned by the Ottoman Turks in Aleppo during an Ottoman campaign to slaughter Christians. Many people attempted to interfere and negotiate for Tappouni's release, including Emperor Franz Joseph of Austria.

After his release, he was named Archbishop of Aleppo by Patriarch Rahmani on 24 February 1921. On 24 June Tappouni was unanimously chosen by the Syrian Synod to replace the late Rahmani as Patriarch of Antioch, the leader of the Syriac Catholic Church. Pope Pius XI confirmed his election on 15 July and created him Cardinal Priest of Ss. XII Apostoli in the consistory of 16 December 1935. Tappouni, who took the name Ignatius Gabriel, was the first Eastern Rite prelate to enter the College of Cardinals since 1895. (Note: Prior to Patriarch Tappouni, the last Eastern Catholic prelate to be elevated to the College of Cardinals was Sylvester Sembratovych, archbishop of the Ukrainian Greek Catholic Church who was made Cardinal-Priest of Santo Stefano al Monte Celio by Pope Leo XIII on 29 November 1895.)

Around 1945, he was sentenced to death by one of the axis countries, but the sentence was never carried out as the axis government was abolished because of the end of world war 2.

Tappouni was one of the cardinal electors in the 1939 papal conclave, which selected Pope Pius XII, and again voted in the 1958 conclave, which selected Pope John XXIII. From 1962 to 1965, he attended the Second Vatican Council and sat on its Board of Presidency. After serving as a cardinal elector in the 1963 conclave, Tappouni resigned his cardinal's titular church (Ss. XII Apostoli) on 11 February 1965 when he was raised to the rank of cardinal bishop pursuant to Pope Paul VI's motu propio Ad Purpuratorum Patrum issued on that day which decreed that Eastern patriarchs elevated to the College of Cardinals would be cardinal bishops, ranked after the suburbicarian cardinal-bishops, and maintain their patriarchal sees and not receive any assignment to associate them with the Diocese of Rome.

He died in Lebanon at age 88, and is buried at the Syriac Catholic Monastery of Charfeh in Daraoun, Lebanon.

Theologically conservative, Tappouni urged Cardinal Giuseppe Siri to put forward his candidacy at the conclave of 1963.

== Literature ==
- The Journal of The Syriac Catholic Parish of Aleppo.
- Pham, John-Peter. "Heirs of the Fisherman: Behind the Scenes of Papal Death and Succession". Oxford University Press, 2007.

Catholic Church titles
Preceded by Pietro La Fontaine	Cardinal-Priest of Ss. XX Apostoli; 1935–1965	Succeeded by Francesco Roberti
Preceded by Ignatius Ephrem II Rahmani	Patriarch of Antioch of the Syrian Catholic Church; 1929–1968	Succeeded by Ignatius Antony II Hayyek
