= Ignatius George V Shelhot =

Head of the Syriac Catholic Church from 1874 to 1891

Mar Ignatius George V Chelhot
- Patriarch of Antioch
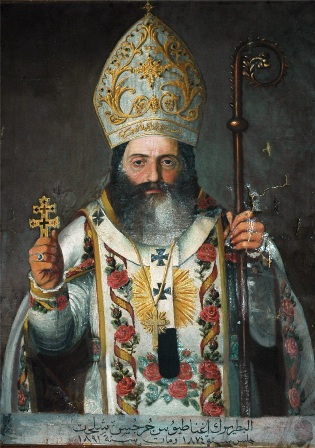
- Church: Syriac Catholic Church
- See: Patriarch of Antioch
- Installed: 11 October 1874
- Term ended: 8 December 1891
- Predecessor: Ignatius Philip I Arkus
- Successor: Ignatius Behnam II Benni

Orders
- Ordination: 2 Febr 1843 (Priest)
- Consecration: 25 May 1862 (Bishop) by Antony I Samheri

Personal details
- Born: Giwargis Chelhot; 15 October 1818 Aleppo, Syria
- Died: 8 December 1891 (aged 73) Aleppo
- Residence: Aleppo, and Charfeh (Mount Lebanon)

Mar Ignatius George V Shelhot (or Giwargis Chelhot, or Georgius Schelhot, or Jirjis Chalhat 1818–1891) was patriarch of the Syriac Catholic Church from 1874 to 1891.

== Life ==
George Chelhot was born in Aleppo on 15 October 1818.

He was ordained priest on 2 February 1843. When an anti-Christian massacre occurred in Aleppo in October 1850, he was sent in Europe to try to raise funds to restore the church-buildings, but at the death of Patriarch Ignatius Peter VII Jarweh he had to return home without success.

He was elected bishop of Aleppo on 7 January 1862 and consecrated bishop on 25 May 1862 by Patriarch Ignatius Antony I Samheri. At the death of Patriarch Ignatius Antony I Samheri on 16 June 1864, he was appointed Locum tenens of the patriarchate. He withdraw his candidature to patriarchate not to have to go to live in Mardin. He used the funds that Patriarch Samheri had raised in Europe to establish schools for his community. In 1870 he participated to the First Vatican Council.

On 7 October 1874, a few months after Patriarch Ignatius Philip I Arkus death, George Shelhot was elected patriarch. In order to point out his independence from the directions of centralization typical of Pope Pius IX, he decided to be enthroned on 11 October without waiting for the papal confirmation (that arrived shortly later on 21 December 1874). George Shelhot moved the patriarchal See to Aleppo.

In 1876 George Shelhot founded a new religious order, the Brothers of Mar Ephrem. In 1888 he summoned a synod of the Syriac Catholic Church at Charfeh (in Mount Lebanon) where important decisions were taken: the celibacy was made mandatory for almost all the clergy and the independence of the Syriac Church in choosing own patriarch was reaffirmed. These canons were approved by Pope Leo XIII who was particularly well-disposed towards the Eastern Catholic Churches.

George Shelhot died in Aleppo on 8 December 1891.

== Sources ==
- Frazee, Charles A. (2006) [1983]. Catholics and Sultans: The Church and the Ottoman Empire 1453-1923. Cambridge: Cambridge University Press. ISBN 9780521027007.
- David, CJ, Schelhot, JG (2021) [1885]. Psalterium Syriacum : juxta versionem simplicem, pschittam vulgo dictam ad usum cleri Ecclesiae Antiochenae Syrorum.Typ. Fratrum Praedicatorum: University of Bonn.
- "http

://www.gcatholic.org/p/1616". Giga Catholic: Syriac Patriarchal See of Antioch, Patriarch Ignace Georges V Chalhat (Dionysius George Chalhat). 8 December 1997. Archived from the original on 5 March, 2013.
