= Ignatius Simon II Hindi Zora =

Head of the Syriac Catholic Church from 1814 to 1817

Mar Ignatius Simon II (Hindi) Zora
- Patriarch of Antioch
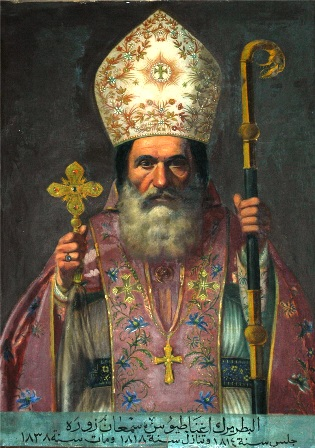
- Church: Syriac Catholic Church
- See: Patriarch of Antioch
- Installed: 13 January 1814
- Term ended: 23 May 1817
- Predecessor: Ignatius Michael IV Daher
- Successor: Ignatius Peter VII Jarweh

Mar Ignatius Gregory Simon II Zora, born Rabban Hindi (1754–1838), was the patriarch of the Syriac Catholic Church from 1814 to 1817.

== Life ==
Simon Zora converted to the Syriac Catholic Church in 1804 from Syrian Orthodox Church and in 1812 was appointed archbishop of Damascus. After the resignation of Ignatius Michael IV Daher, accepted by Pope Pius VII only in 1812, Simon Zora was elected patriarch on January 13, 1814, and confirmed by Rome on March 8, 1816. His patriarchate was particularly troubled because of quarrels among the bishops. Simon Zora collided with both the former patriarch Michel Daher, now bishop of Aleppo, and with the bishop of Jerusalem, Peter Jarweh. Because of these troubles, Simon Zora resigned on May 23, 1817, and his resignation was accepted by Propaganda Fide on June 1, 1818.

After Simon Zora's resignation, the Vatican appointed as patriarchal vicar the bishop of Aleppo, Denys Michel Hadaja (who died on 6 January 1827).
