= Cathedral of Our Lady of the Assumption, Aleppo =

Syriac church

Cathedral of Our Lady of Assumption
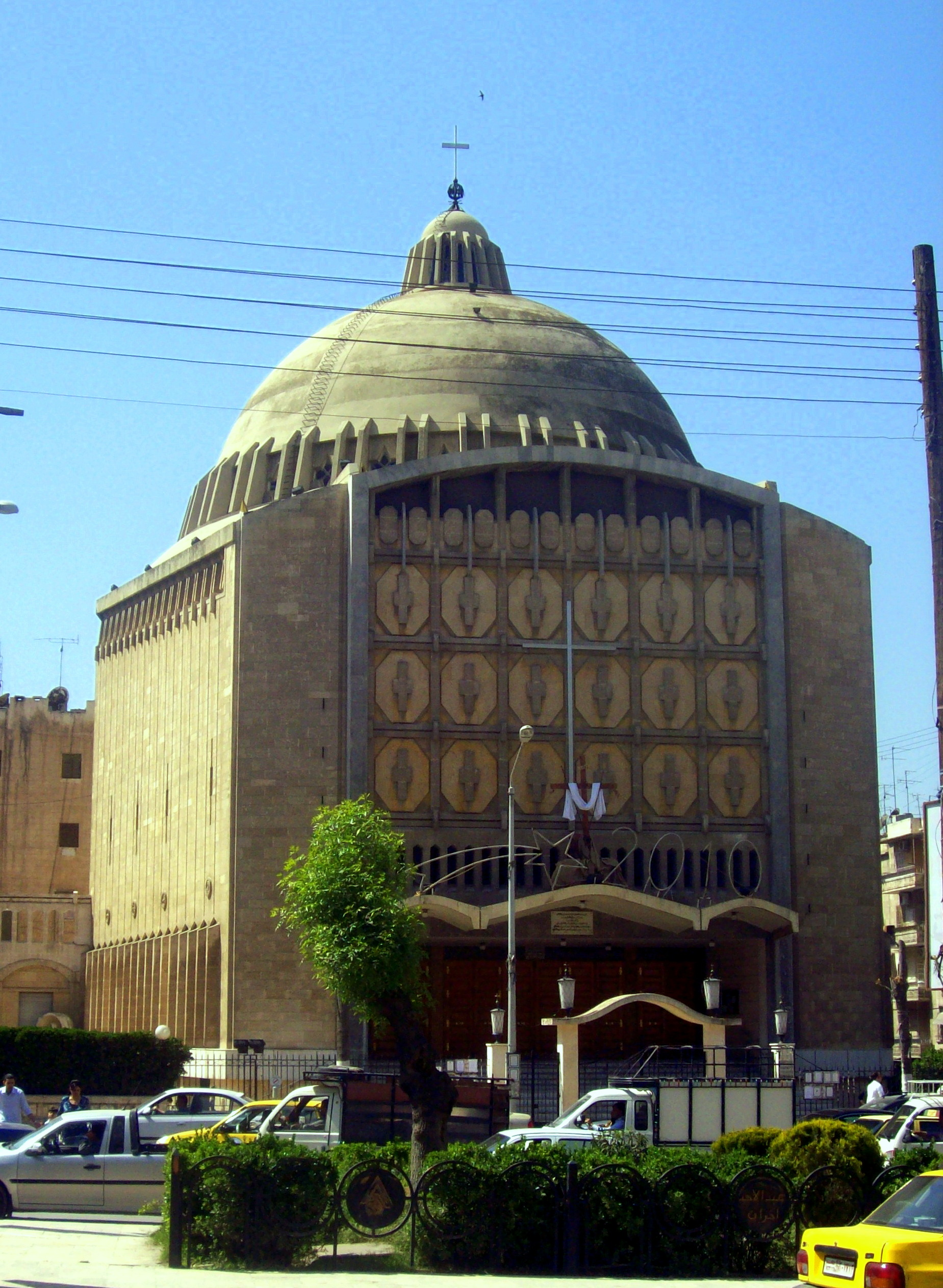
- Cathedral of Our Lady of Assumption

- Location in Aleppo

Religion
- Affiliation: Syriac Catholic Church
- Region: Syriac Catholic Archeparchy of Aleppo
- Ecclesiastical or organisational status: active
- Year consecrated: 1970; 2018(re-dedicated)

Location
- Location: Al-Jdayde quarter, Farhat Square, Aleppo, Syria
- Coordinates: 36.210949°N 37.155964°E

Architecture
- Type: Church
- Completed: 1500 (original building); 1970 (current building)

Cathedral of Our Lady of Assumption (Arabic: كاتدرائية سيدة الانتقال), is an Eastern Catholic (Syriac) church in Aleppo, Syria, located in the Christian quarter of al-Jdayde. The current church was built in 1970, replacing the old cathedral. Due to the Syrian civil war it was closed from 2012 to 2018.

== History ==
The original Syriac cathedral in Aleppo was constructed in 1500s, and was one of the earliest churches built in the historic neighborhood of al-Jdayde. The church was originally called the Cathedral of Our Lady of Syrians and was the seat of the Syrian Catholic Patriarchate between the 17th and 19th centuries. It continued to serve as the main cathedral for the Syrian Catholic diocese of Aleppo until 1970, when the newly constructed Cathedral of Our Lady of Assumption was completed and the seat of the cathedral was moved there. The original church still stands and is today known as the Syrian Catholic Church of Mar Assia al-Hakim (كنيسة مار اسيا الحكيم السريان الكاثوليك).

=== Syrian Civil War ===
During the Battle of Aleppo the cathedral, as with most of Aleppo, sustained serious damage and was closed from 2012 to 2016 during the fighting, and from 2016 to 2018 due to the building being too damaged to hold religious services.

=== Re-opening ===
In September 2018 the cathedral was re-opened and re-dedicated by Syriac Catholic Patriarch Ignace Joseph III Younan, with apostolic nuncio Mario Zenari also in attendance, along with members of other Christian denominations. During a three-month process earlier that year, the renown Syrian artists the Badawi brothers had re-painted the murals of the church that had been ruined in the war, with an area of 700 square meters it is the most extensive artistic project undertaken in Aleppo since the war there ended. The complex mosaics of the building had to also be re-done. In 2019 Christmas was celebrated at the cathedral for the first time since its re-opening.

== See also ==
- Aleppo
- List of churches in Aleppo
