= Mar Assia al-Hakim Church =

Church building in Aleppo, Syria

Mar Assia Al-Hakim Church
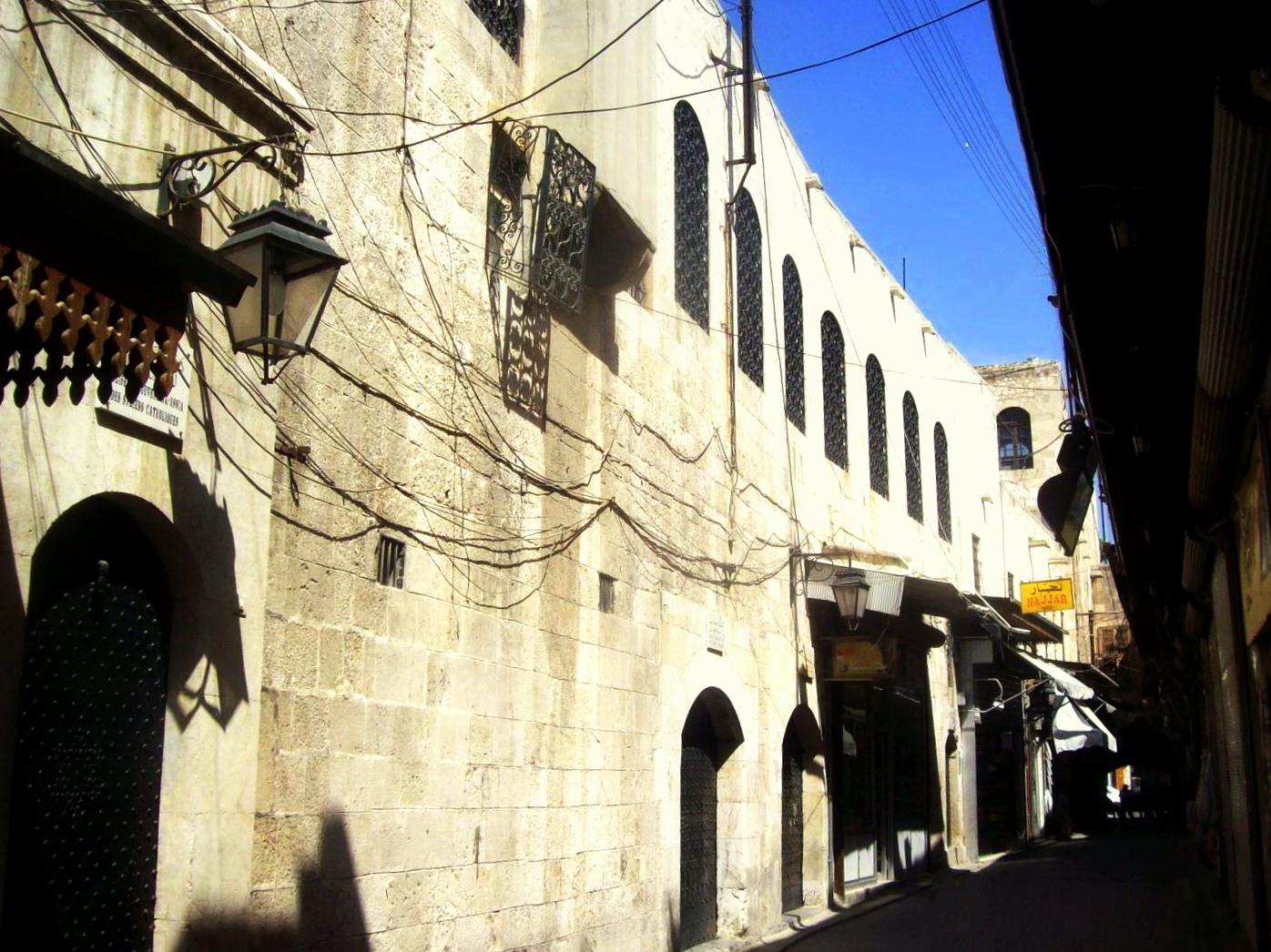
- Mar Assia al-Hakim Church in the historic al-Jdayde quarter

- Location in Aleppo

Religion
- Affiliation: Syriac Catholic Church
- Region: Aleppo
- Ecclesiastical or organisational status: Temporarily abandoned
- Year consecrated: 1500

Location
- Location: Al-Jdayde quarter, Aleppo, Syria
- Coordinates: 36.206066°N 37.156161°E

Architecture
- Type: Church
- Dome: 1

Mar Assia al-Hakim Church (Arabic: كنيسة مار آسيا الحكيم) is a Syriac Catholic Church in Al-Jdayde quarter of Aleppo, Syria. The church belongs to the Archeparchy of Aleppo of the Syrian Catholic Church. It was completed in 1500 and is active up to now.

== History ==
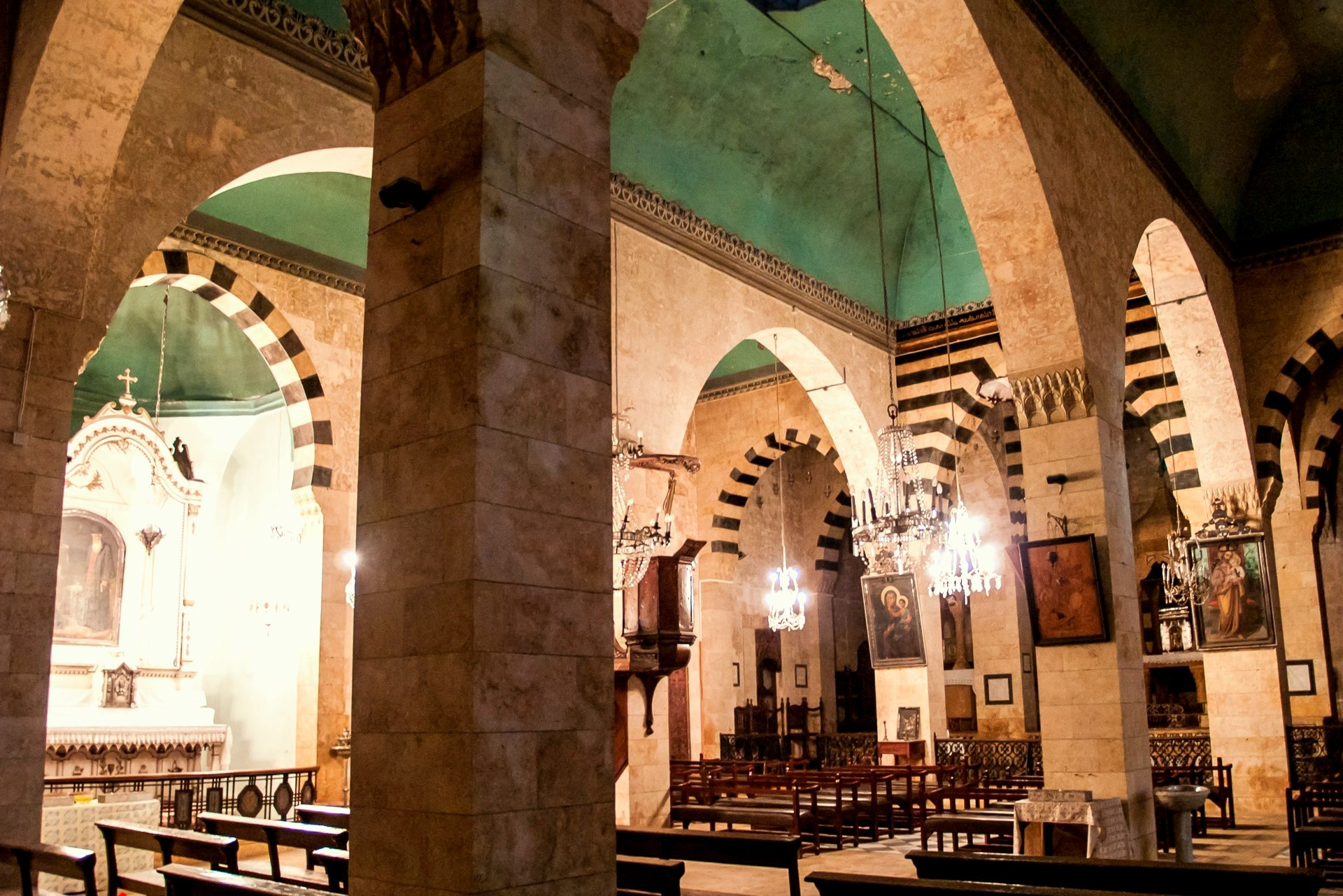
Mar Assia al-Hakim Church.

After Tamerlane invaded Aleppo in 1400 and destroyed it, the Christians migrated out of the city walls and established their own neighbourhood in 1420, at the northwestern suburbs of the city, thus founding the quarters of al-Jdayde. The vast majority of the Christian population returned to Aleppo by the end of the 15th century. The Syrian Catholic population of the city had re-established its presence in Aleppo and re-built the church in 1500 and called it the Cathedral of Our Lady of the Syrians. The Cathedral became the seat of the Syriac Catholic Patriarchate between the 17th and the 19th centuries. The church is mentioned by the Italian explorer Pietro Della Valle who visited Aleppo in 1625.

The Church Our Lady of Syrians continued to serve as the main cathedral of the Syriac Catholic prelacy, the diocese of Aleppo, until 1970 when the new Cathedral of Our Lady of Assumption was opened in the central parts of the city of Aleppo, thus moving the prelacy to the newly built cathedral. The old church was renamed after Mar Assia al-Hakim (meaning Saint Assia the Wise) during the same year.

The Church of Mar Assia al-Hakim has a length of 32 meters and a width of 16 meters.

== Damage ==
During its existence, the church was damaged twice: the first disaster was in October 1850 during the Aleppo massacre of 1850. The church was damaged for the second time in its history, during the Syrian civil war when the belfry which dates back to 1881 was destroyed after being shelled by the armed groups of the Free Syrian Army on 16 September 2012.

== See also ==
- List of churches in Aleppo
