= Ignatius Andrew Akijan =

Head of the Syriac Catholic Church from 1662 to 1677

Mar Ignatius Andrew Akijan
- Patriarch of Antioch
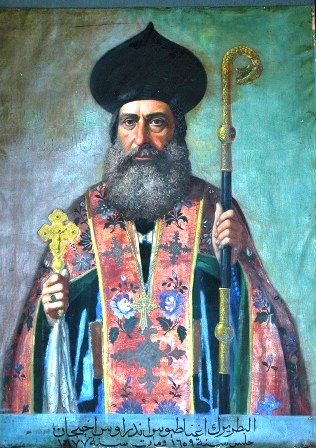
- Church: Syriac Catholic Church
- See: Patriarch of Antioch
- Installed: 20 August 1662
- Term ended: 18 July 1677
- Predecessor: Ignatius Yeshu II
- Successor: Ignatius Gregory Peter VI Shahbaddin

Personal details
- Born: 'Abdul-Ghal Akijan; 1622 Mardin
- Died: 18 July 1677 (aged 54–55) Aleppo

Mar Ignatius Andrew 'Abdul-Ghal Akijan (or Akhidjan, Akidjian, 1622–1677) was the Patriarch of the Syriac Catholic Church from 1662 to 1677. His election as patriarch marked the first separation of the hierarchy between the Syriac Catholic Church and the Syriac Orthodox Church.

== Life ==
Andrew Akijan was born in 1622 in Mardin and soon came in contact with the Carmelites missionaries. He studied from 1649 in the Maronite College in Rome and after three years he returned in the East where he was ordained priest in 1652 by the Maronite patriarch.

In those years in Aleppo a number of Syriac Christians entered in full communion with the Catholic Church and formed the first Syrian Catholic community. They chose as their bishop Akijan, who was consecrated on 29 June 1656 by Maronite patriarch John Bawab of Safra, taking the name of Andrew. He took possession of his church on 9 August 1656. He suffered a strong and violent opposition by the Orthodox Syriacs that forced him to escape in Lebanon on 15 May 1657, from where he returned to Aleppo on 12 March 1658. His ministry as Syriac bishop of Aleppo was confirmed by the Pope on 28 January 1659.

At the death of the Syrian Patriarch in 1662, the Syrian Catholic party in Aleppo was able to persuade the synod of the Syriac Church to elect Andrew Akijan as patriarch, and thus he was elected on 19 April 1662, but with the opposition of the Orthodox party which elected Abdul Masih as patriarch. On 3 August 1662 the Ottoman Sultan Mehmed IV confirmed Akijan in the patriarchal office and on 20 August 1662 he was formally enthroned, taking the traditional name of Ignatius.

The Roman Congregation for the Propagation of the Faith, unknown of Akijan's election, in September 1662 disapproved the means of propagation of the Catholic faith which involved gifts to the authorities to obtain appointment, and thus took a stand against Akijan's appointment as Patriarch. Later, after being informed about the actual promotion of Akijan, Rome granted his confirmation on 23 April 1663.

The reign of Akijan was initially quite troubled. Abdul Masih claimed the Patriarchate and in 1663 occupied the cathedral of Aleppo, but in January 1664 Akijan was successful in being restored. On 10 April 1664 the Sultan Mehmed IV confirmed Akijan as head of the whole Syriac-Christian Millet all over the Ottoman Empire, and this status lasted till Akijan's death. Andrew Akijan died peacefully in Aleppo on 18 July 1677.

== Sources ==
- Frazee, Charles A. (2006) [1983]. Catholics and Sultans: The Church and the Ottoman Empire 1453-1923. Cambridge: Cambridge University Press. ISBN 9780521027007.
