= Ignatius George IV =

110th Patriarch of the Syriac Orthodox Church of Antioch (1768–1781)

- Syriac Orthodox Patriarch of Antioch and All the East
- Church: Syriac Orthodox Church
- See: Antioch
- Installed: 1768
- Term ended: 1781
- Predecessor: Ignatius George III
- Successor: Ignatius Matthew

Personal details
- Born: George; 1709 Mosul, Ottoman Empire
- Died: July 21 1781 (aged 71–72) Mor Hananyo, Mardin
- Residence: Mor Hananyo

Ignatius George IV was the Patriarch of Antioch and head of the Syriac Orthodox Church from 1768 until his death in 1781.

== Biography ==
George was born in Mosul in 1709. His father's name was Mousa and he was from the family of priest Abdaljalil from Mosul. He gained knowledge in Syriac and religious studies and in 1729 he travelled to Mor Hananyo where he was ordained a monk and then a priest. In January 1737, Ignatius Shukrallah II ordained him as Metropolitan of Hattack near Diyarbakir, calling him Cyril George. In 1742, Ignatius George III sent him on a mission to Mosul to check on the diocese there and while he was there Nader Shah laid siege on Mosul for about one month. After the siege was lifted, he stayed to take care of renovating the churches in Mosul that were damaged by the artillery of Nader Shah's campaign including the Church of Saint Thomas. In 1747, Patriarch Ignatius George III appointed him as the superior of Mor Hananyo and the diocese of Mardin. When Basil Lazarus IV, Syriac Orthodox Maphrian of the East died in 1759, Patriarch Ignatius George III selected Cyril George as the new Maphrian in 1760, and was given the name Basil George and was consecrated at the church in Amid. As was still the superior of Mor Hananyo, he gave the administration of the Maphrianate to his cousin Bishop Cyril Rizk Allah from Mosul. In 1762, he visited Mosul again and stayed there until 1763

When Ignatius George III died in July 1768, the Holy Synod elected Basil George as the new patriarch after a request from the faithful in Mardin and Amid. The new patriarch inherited a lot of debt from his predecessors and many churches and monasteries were in a bad shape due to the effects of the schism in the church. After he was consecrated, he went his brother, Deacon Isaiah, to the capital, Constantinople, and he obtained the royal decree for him for the Ottoman Sultan. During his reign, he paid all the church debt and build and renovated many churches and monasteries.

During his time as a patriarch, the pull of the Roman Catholic doctrine was appearing in the diocese of Aleppo and pushing it to secede from the Syriac Orthodox Church with support from the Catholic Missionaries and the French counsel in Aleppo. This movement was led by the bishop Michael Jarwa, who was the Syriac Orthodox Church Metropolitan of Aleppo and who was ordained by patriarch Ignatius George III in 1766. Ignatius George IV tried to solve the issues and gain the faithful back to the church but the diocese of Aleppo ended up seceding from the "mother church" with the exception of two priests and few families.

== Episcopal succession ==
During Ignatius George IV time as a Patriarch and a Maphrian, he had the duty to ordain and consecrate many Metropolitans in the Syria Orthodox church in addition to tens of priests, monks, and deacons

1. Cyril Bishara (1761–1789). Metropolitan of the Patriarchal office, in 1773 bishop of Amid, later Metropolitan of Jerusalem
2. Iyawannis Behnam (1763–1776). Metropolitan of the Monastery of Mor Behnam
3. Gregorius Antone (1768–1774). Bishop of Gargar and Hisn Mansour
4. Cyril Matthew Abdulahad (1770 -1782). Metropolitan of Mosul and Mor Mattai Monastery . Later, he was elected Ignatius Matthew, the 111th Patriarch of Syriac Orthodox Church (1782–1817).
5. Cyril Mansour. Metropolitan of Jerusalem
6. Cyril Mousa (1771). Metropolitan of Mar Mousa Monastery in Syria
7. Clemis Ibraheem (1772). Ecumenical Metropolitan
8. Julius Abdulahad (1774-1792)). Metropolitan of the Patriarchal office, abbot of Mor Hananyo Monastery.
9. Iyawannis Ne’matallah (1774). Ecumenical Metropolitan
10. Timothy Abdulahad (1774). Metropolitan of Bitlis
11. Dionysius Abdullah (1777). Metropolitan of Aleppo
12. Cyril Ibraheem (1777). Ecumenical Metropolitan
13. Jacob Mirijan (1778–1804). Bishop of Mydiat
14. Julius Israel (1779). Metropolitan of the Monastery of Beth El
15. Cyril Andulaziz (1782-1816). Bishop of Mosul and Mor Mattai Monastery

== Death ==
Ignatius George IV died in 1781 in Mor Hananyo and was buried at Beth Qadish in the same monastery.

Preceded by Basil Lazarus IV	Syriac Orthodox Maphrian of the East; 1760-1768	Succeeded by Basil Sliba
Preceded by Ignatius George III	Syriac Orthodox Patriarch of Antioch; 1768-1781	Succeeded by Ignatius Matthew
