= Ignatius Gregory Peter VI Shahbaddin =

Head of the Syriac Catholic Church from 1678 to 1702

Mar Ignatius Gregory Peter VI Shahbaddin
- Patriarch of Antioch
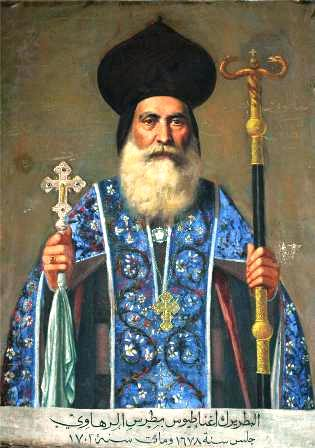
- Church: Syriac Catholic Church
- See: Patriarch of Antioch
- Installed: 2 April 1678
- Term ended: 4 March 1702
- Predecessor: Ignatius Andrew Akijan
- Successor: in 1783, Ignatius Michael III Jarweh

Personal details
- Born: c. 1641
- Died: 4 March 1702 Adana

Mar Ignatius Gregory Peter VI Shahbaddin (1641–1702) was the Patriarch of the Syriac Catholic Church from 1678 to 1702. His death under circumstances marked the end of the first attempt of union between the Syriac Orthodox Church and the Catholic Church.

== Life ==
Gregory Peter Shahbaddin, possibly born about 1641, was the nephew of Ignatius Abdulmasih I (later patriarch) and he became the Syriac Archbishop of Jerusalem in 1662.

Abdul Masih was the leader of the Syriac Orthodox Church and since 1662 opposed the pro-Catholic Patriarch Ignatius Andrew Akijan. At the death of Andrew Akijan, in July 1677, Abdul Masih misled the pro-Catholic faction professing himself in communion with the Catholic Church in order to be elected as patriarch, but as soon as he obtained the firman of appointment by the Ottoman Sultan, he did a complete about-face. Thus the pro-Catholic faction in Aleppo elected in his place his nephew, Shahbaddin, who had become a supporter of Andrew Akijan.

=== Patriarch ===
After election, Shahbaddin obtained, also thanks to the French Consul, the confirmation as patriarch from the Sultan, and he was enthroned on 2 April 1678. He was later confirmed also by Pope Innocent XI who granted him the Pallium, the sign of patriarchal authority, on 12 June 1679.

The next years were deeply marked by the clashes between the opposite factions, the pro-Catholic and the pro-Orthodox, who both tried to win over to their side the Ottoman authorities. This resulted in five depositions and re-instalment of Shahbaddin. Year after year, the Ottoman authorities took a stand in favour of the pro-Orthodox faction, and the clashes soon degraded in a true persecution from the Orthodox Syrians towards the pro-Catholic party.

In 1696 Shahbaddin, with Archbishop Gregory Isho (Josue) of Jerusalem, traveled to Rome to raise funds. In Rome they met Pope Innocent XII and they remained there till 1700 when, through the support of Leopold I, Holy Roman Emperor and of Louis XIV, King of France, they could reach Istanbul. Shahbaddin was thus re-installed on 1 March 1701 for the fifth time as Syrian Patriarch in Aleppo.

=== Death ===
This last re-instalment ended after a few months due to the persecutions from the pro-Orthodox faction and the Ottoman authorities. On 27 August 1701 Shahbaddin, the Archbishop Dionysius Amin Kahn Risqallah of Aleppo, and most of the clergy were arrested, beaten and imprisoned. On 10 November 1701 they were transferred with a forced march from Aleppo to the castle of Adana. Bishop Amin Kahn Risqallah died the same day he arrived in the castle, on 18 November, because of the wounds suffered during the march, and the others captives were kept imprisoned for some months.

Notwithstanding the fierce complaints of the Western rules, Shahbaddin was not released, and on 4 March 1702 he was offered a coffee by the commanding officer of the castle, and in the same night he died, quite surely poisoned.

== Successive events ==
After Shahbaddin's death on 4 March 1702, the clergy remained in prison in Adana till early 1704. During their captivity, on 23 November 1703, they elected as new Patriarch the maphrian and Archbishop of Nineveh Isaac Basilios Joubeir (or Basil Ishaq ibn Jubair, c. 1645–1721), who at the time was in Istanbul in the French consulate. He was later confirmed as patriarch on 17 November 1704 by Rome. But he refused to accept the patriarchal title anyway and continued to consider himself only as a Maphrian, waiting for a better time. In 1706 he moved to Rome where he died on 18 May 1721. The Syrian Catholic Church had a new patriarch only in 1783 with Ignatius Michael III Jarweh.

== Sources ==
- Fiey, Jean Maurice (1993). Pour un Oriens Christianus Novus: Répertoire des diocèses syriaques orientaux et occidentaux. Beirut: Orient-Institut. ISBN 9783515057189.
