= Ignatius Michael III Jarweh =

Head of the Syriac Catholic Church from 1783 to 1800

Mar Ignatius Michael III Jarweh
- Patriarch of Antioch
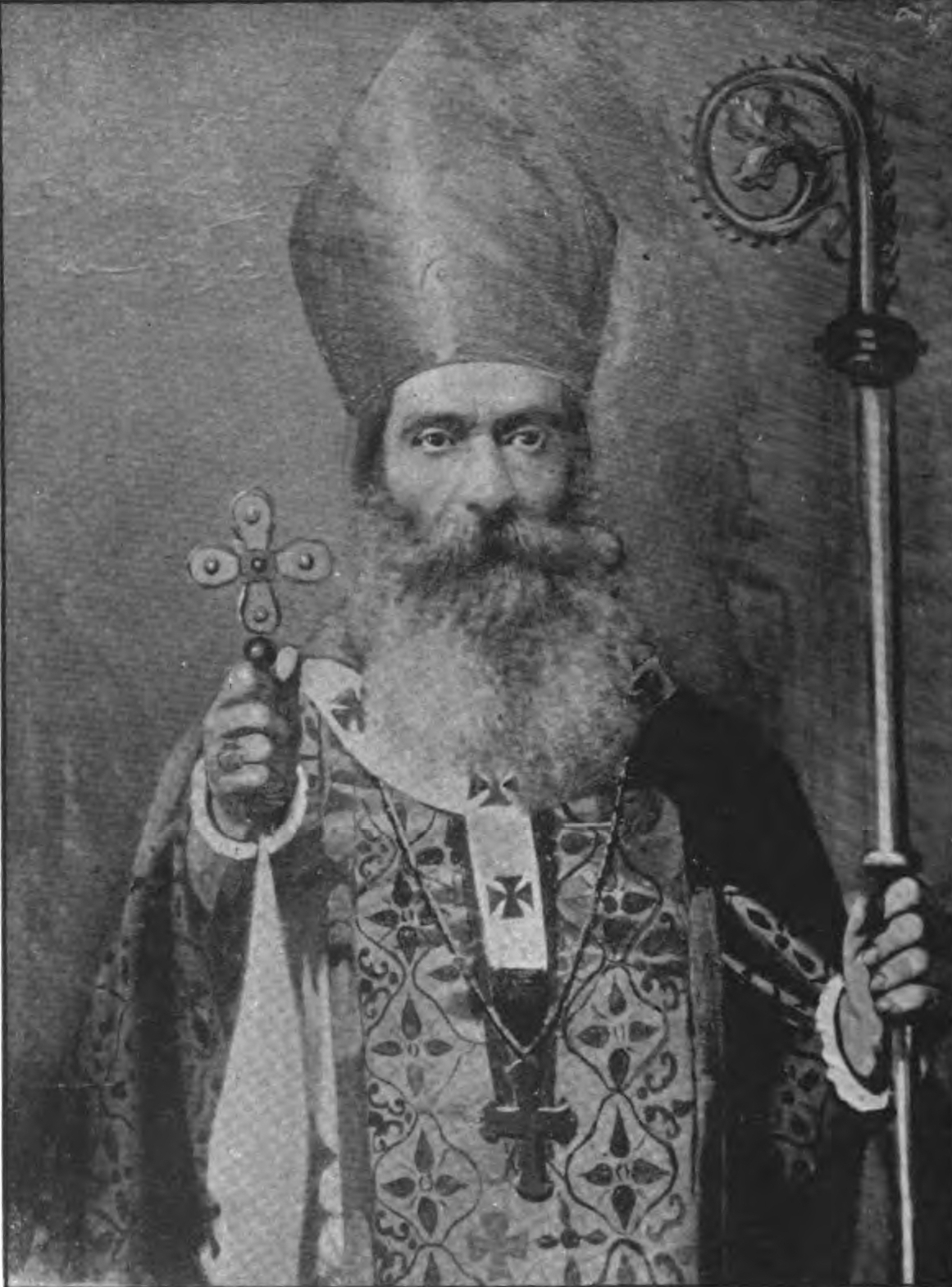
- Church: Syriac Catholic Church
- See: Patriarch of Antioch
- Installed: January 22, 1783
- Term ended: September 4, 1800
- Predecessor: Ignatius George IV
- Successor: Ignatius Michael IV Daher

Personal details
- Born: Dionysius Michael Jarweh ibn Ni'matallah; January 3, 1731 Aleppo, Syria
- Died: 4 September 1800 (aged 69) Al-Charfet monastery, Mount Lebanon
- Residence: Aleppo, and then Charfet

Mar Ignatius Michael III Jarweh ibn Ni'matallah (or Javré, Jaroueh, Garweh, Djarweh, Giarvé, 1731–1800) was the 111th patriarch of Antioch and patriarch of the Syriac Catholic Church from 1783 to 1800.

In 1757 Michael Jarweh converted to Catholicism and took with him a large number of his congregants.

== Life ==
=== Bishop of Aleppo ===
Michael Jarweh was born on January 3, 1731, in Aleppo. He spent some time as deacon in Edessa and in 1757 he was ordained a priest by the Syrian bishop of Aleppo, George Fattal, who also appointed him as procurator of the church of Aleppo. He was distinguished for his sermons and for his concern for the poor.

In those years Michael came in contact with the Melkite Archbishop Ignatius Karbousse of Aleppo. He also was on good terms with the Jesuit missionaries, who were respectful of the Oriental traditions, while he always had difficulties with the Franciscan missionaries, more inclined to ask for latinization. In November 1757 Michael made a pilgrimage to Jerusalem and from that time he was a Catholic at heart.

A few years later Michael Jarweh decided to visit the Syriac Patriarch Ignatius George III in Amid and to explain to him his belief in union with Rome. He did not succeed in persuading the patriarch to enter into communion with the Catholic Church, but Michael impressed the patriarch so much that he was appointed bishop of Aleppo, being consecrated in the Church of Our Lady in Amid on February 23, 1766, by the patriarch himself.

A short time after Michael Jarweh returned to Aleppo, the patriarch died and the new patriarch, Ignatius George IV, was strongly opposed to any relations with the Catholic Church. He summoned Michael to visit him with a letter dated January 5, 1769. Thus Michael reached the patriarch's abode, the Dayr al-Zafaran monastery, where he tried to persuade the patriarch about his faith, with the only result being his imprisonment for four years in the monastery. In 1772, while Michael was being forcibly kept in the monastery, the patriarch denounced and made imprisoned other pro-Catholics in Aleppo. They were released by the Ottoman authorities only after the payment of a large ransom. Early in 1773, these believers met in the Church of Our Lady in Aleppo and wrote a letter to Rome asking for communion.

Michael Jarweh escaped from the Dayr al-Zafaran monastery only a year later, and on December 8, 1774, he reached his flock in Aleppo. On December 16, 1774, Michael made a profession of faith in front of the Melkite Archbishop Karbousse and wrote to Rome. Because of some contrary reports of both the Franciscan missionaries and of the Catholic delegate for the Syrians Joseph Kodsi, Rome took some time to take a decision in favor of Michael, but on June 23, 1775 Pope Pius VI recognized Michael as a true Catholic and as bishop of Aleppo.

In Aleppo, Michael continued to be the object of attacks from the traditionalists, who according to Ottoman Law also had civil authority over him, and he had to escape to Cyprus and later to Egypt. Having returned to Aleppo, he went on persuading, with success, bishops and believers about his idea of full communion with the Catholic Church.

=== Patriarch ===
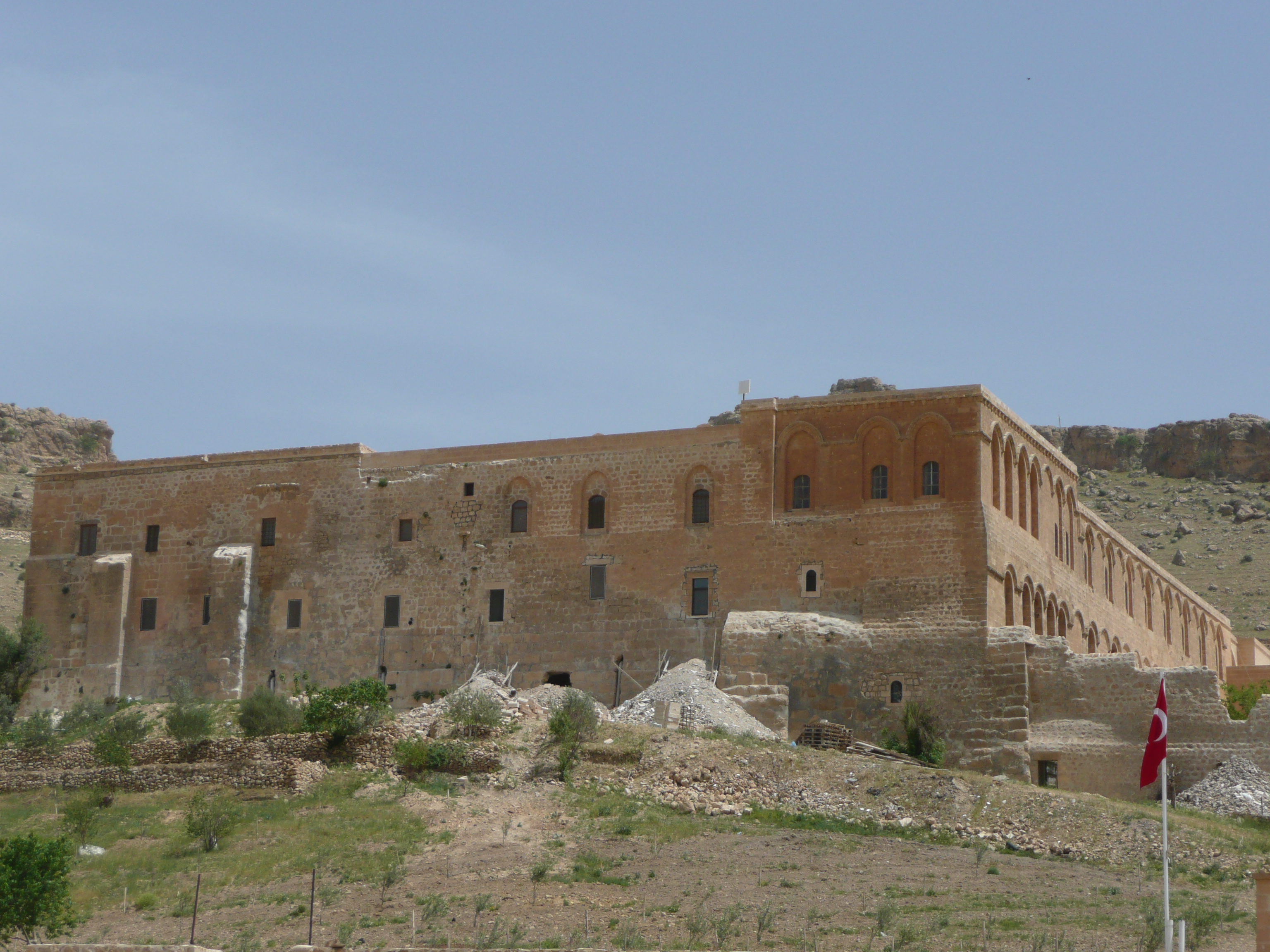
Dayr al-Zafaran monastery

On July 21, 1781, Patriarch George IV died, and the bishops (five bishops were present), clergy and laity met in the Dayr al-Zafaran monastery and elected him as patriarch; he accepted only after the reading and the approval of a Catholic declaration of faith in the church of the Forty Martyrs. He was enthroned in Dayr al-Zafaran monastery on January 22, 1783, and took the traditional name of Ignatius III. His election was confirmed by the Pope on September 14, 1783, and he received the Pallium, the sign of patriarchal authority, on December 15 of the same year. The Syrian Catholic Church once again had a patriarch, having lacked one since the death in 1702 of Ignatius Gregory Peter VI Shahbaddin.

Two bishops opposed his election : Mar Matta ben Abdel-Ahad Saalab metropolitan of Mosul and his brother, Mar Julius Abdel-Ahad, superior of Saffron Monastery.Two days after Michael's enthronement they took the money of the monastery and paid a group of Kurds who attacked Mardin making fatalities: Michael saved himself, but lost many days. In the meantime one of these two Orthodox bishops, , consecrated bishop four of his monks in order to hold a second election and thus he was elected patriarch. This party arrived at Istanbul before Michael's envoy, and received the formal approval of the Ottoman authorities: thus Michael became an outlaw and was imprisoned. After the payment of a ransom, Michael moved to Baghdad, waiting for the appeal, and later escaped from Baghdad disguised as Bedouin. He arrived in Lebanon having lost everything, and went to live in the ruins of the Kesroan monastery.

Helped by the Maronites, and with some funds raised in Europe, Michael Jarweh bought on September 22, 1786, the Al-Charfet (or Sharfeh) monastery on Mount Lebanon that he dedicated to Our Lady of Deliverance. This monastery was used as a seminary for the education of new priests and a large library was set up. On September 19, 1791, the patriarchal See was moved from Mardin to Al-Charfet; it is still used as the summer abode of the Syrian Catholic patriarch. Lebanon granted a certain security, but the majority of believers lived far away, mainly in the areas of Aleppo and Mosul.

Michael Jarweh died on September 4, 1800.

== Works ==
Michael Jarweh left many homilies, a text on the sacrifice of the Mass, and an autobiography

== Sources ==
- Frazee, Charles A. (2006) [1983]. Catholics and Sultans: The Church and the Ottoman Empire 1453-1923. Cambridge: Cambridge University Press. ISBN 9780521027007.
