= Massacre of Aleppo (1850) =

Anti-Christian riots in Syria

Coordinates: 36°12′25″N 37°09′22″E

The Events of 1850
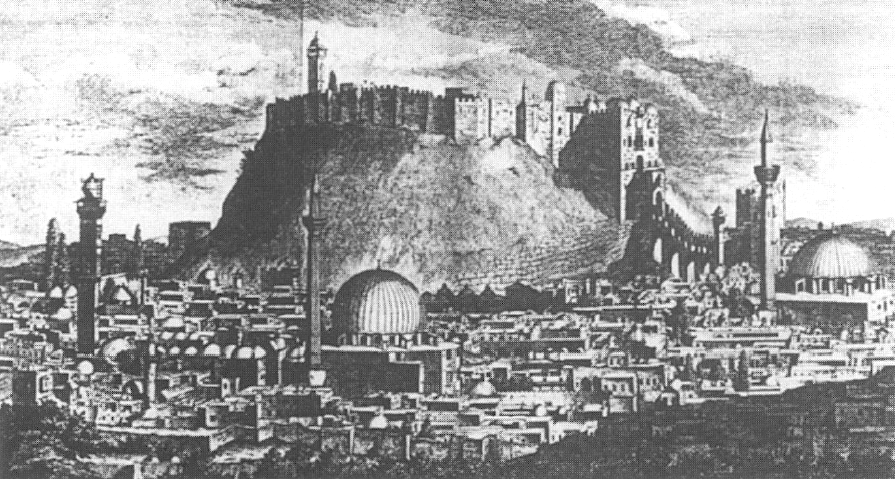
- Aleppo, 1754
- Location: Aleppo, Syria
- Date: 17 October – 8 November 1850
- Target: Christians
- Attack type: Mass murder, looting, bombardment
- Deaths: 70 from riots 5,000 from bombardment
- Victims: 5,000 Christian killed
- Perpetrators: Muslim rioters, later Ottoman Army

The Massacre of Aleppo (Arabic: قومة حلب, romanized: Qawmat Ḥalab), often referred to simply as The Events (al-hawādith), was a riot perpetrated by Muslim residents of Aleppo, largely from the eastern quarters of the city, against Christian residents, largely located in the northern suburbs of Judayde (Jdeideh) and Salibeh. The riot began on the evening of October 17, 1850, and ended two days later on October 19, 1850. The riot resulted in numerous deaths, including that of Peter VII Jarweh, the Syriac Catholic Patriarch.

The riot is generally characterized as the culmination of tensions between the diverse groups that had historically populated Aleppo, including tensions between the Muslim and Christian communities and between Janissaries and the ashraf. Non-Aleppine ethnic groups, including Bedouin, have also been blamed for the riot, especially by local historians. It has been argued, however, that The Events reflect instead more complex social dynamics, particularly the disruption caused by the sweeping reforms implemented by the Ottoman Empire in its nineteenth-century attempts at modernization, also known as the Tanzimat, and by the Empire's incorporation into the modern world economic system.

The aftermath included the replacement of the governor of Aleppo, leading to the eruption of fighting between Janissary and ashraf groups on November 5. With the intervention of state forces utilizing artillery purchased from the United Kingdom, the renewed fighting ended by November 8. Attempts at the restitution of stolen property and the bringing of legal charges against rioters spurred on further disagreement between Muslim and Christian residents.

The massacre is considered by historians to be particularly important in Aleppine history since it represents the first time that disturbances pitted Muslims against Christians in the region. Additionally, the implications of The Events include integral insights into the social, political and economic elements of the 19th-century Middle East.

== Background ==
As the Caliphate weakened in the 19th century, restrictions on Christians were eased, due to the increasing intervention and influence of European powers. Catholics and Melkites were officially recognised as Millets in 1831 and 1848, respectively. 1839 reforms allowed Christians to build new churches, which was previously prohibited. A newly formed municipal advisory council provided Christians with the opportunity to express their opinions.

Perhaps the most significant changes during this time, however, were the alterations being made to the taxation system. Traditionally, direct taxation was only required for adult, non-Muslim men, through a system known as jizya. Taxes for Muslims, rather than being applied to the individual, were instead announced by the government and left to be collected by various corporate entities, such as guilds or quarters, from among their individual members. Yet, an individual head tax was introduced for Muslim residents during the Egyptian occupation of Syria in the 1830s, under Muhammad Ali Pasha, and was continued even after the Ottoman forces regained control of the region. Not only did this lead to increasing economic burden upon the Muslim residents of Aleppo, spurring on dramatic decreases in their relative wealth while their Christian neighbours prospered because of connections with Europe, but it also created a sense of disillusionment in terms of the relationship between Muslims and the state, for it undermined the distinction between Muslims and non-Muslims, thereby possibly calling into question the role of Muslims as the defenders of Islam as well. The already apparent class distinction became more dramatic with Muhammad Ali Pasha's modernization efforts and led to the increasing social discontinuity that set the stage for conflict between the Muslim and Christian communities. These taxation reforms were coupled with an economic depression that spread throughout Aleppo in the mid-1800s, and were thus particularly devastating for residents from the eastern quarters of the city, for they were largely engaged in the caravan trade and the grain trade, the two sectors most deeply affected by the economic depression.

As trade with Europe increased, merchants who were mostly Christians and Jews prospered, while Muslim residents faced increasing economic hardships. The Muslim population of the city was badly hit by inflation as a result of the foreign merchandise that flooded the market after Syria was integrated into the world economy. The ease of commercial restrictions upon Christians spurred on discontent among Muslims, for they perceived this to be a threat to their traditional economic advantages in the region. Muslims also sought to stop the building of new churches, without much success. Additionally, Aleppo had a large Janissary faction, which had been growing increasingly discontented with the Ottoman government since their official abolishment in 1826. The janissaries largely resided in the eastern quarters of Aleppo, and were thus particularly affected by these economic hardships.

When the Catholic patriarch Maximos III Mazloum was carried in a procession through the city with much extravagance, Muslims saw this as a sign of increasing Christian domination of the city. Celebratory fire during the festivities gave rise to rumours that Christians were arming themselves.

General reforms occurring within the Ottoman Empire as it attempted to modernize, specifically census-taking and the forced conscription of citizens, also led to increased tensions and feelings of insecurity for the Muslim residents of Aleppo. Following the first-ever census of Aleppo's adult men, rumors spread that the Empire intended to begin to conscript adult men in the area. Backlash against looming threat of conscription, then, meant that the taking of the census became the catalyst for the 1850 riots in Aleppo.

== "The Events" ==
On the evening of Wednesday, October 17, 1850, Aleppian residents protesting against the looming threat of conscription marched to the palace of Mustafa Zarif Pasha, the governor of Aleppo. Pasha barred the gates to his residence and refused to hear their demands, so the protesters then sought out 'Abdallah al-Babinsi, the leader of the city's janissary faction. Although he refused to lead the movement, some accounts of his interactions with the mob state that his remarks carried an implicit approval of the rioters' actions. The rioters then advanced to the predominantly Christian quarters of Judeida and Saliba, located in the northern part of Aleppo, where they began to loot and pillage both churches and private homes. Rioters attacked and killed approximately 20 Christians. During the attacks, many Christians managed to find refuge among the caravanserais in the bazaars or were protected by their Muslim neighbors. The rioting continued throughout the next day, October 18.

On Friday, October 19, the a'yān, or the urban elites, used to their moral authority, in combination with forces supplied by 'Abdallah, to break up the rioters. In turn, they agreed to present the rioters' demands to Pasha. These demands included requests that there would be no conscription, that only recoverable plunder could be returned, that the ringing of church bells and carrying of crosses in religious processions would cease, and that Christians would be prohibited from owning slaves. Initially, Pasha accepted these demands, and also added a pledge that the hated individual head tax would be replaced with a property tax. Additionally, 'Abdallah was appointed acting governor.

On November 2, troops that had been requested by Pasha as reinforcements from the central government arrived, demanding that the city disarm. Before addressing these internal problems, however, the troops were tasked with fighting off the nomadic Bedouin groups that had gathered around the city with the expectations of easily raiding Aleppo, because of its recent chaos. The Bedouins quickly retreated, but because of his rumored connections with them, 'Abdallah was removed from his position as acting governor and replaced by his rival, Yusuf Sharayyifzadah, the leader of the ashraf faction in the city.

Fighting again broke out, this time among Muslims, as ashraf and janissary factions fought over the change in governor. On November 5, the troops used artillery guns purchased from Britain to bombard the centers of insurgency, destroying several quarters and killing more than 5,000 individuals. Fighting then devolved into house-to-house fighting, which was subsequently put down by November 8, when civil order was restored. The official reports estimated that 3,400 had been killed, 1,500 had fled the city and 250 arrested.

== Aftermath ==
After the return of civil order, the pursuit of stolen property and legal charges against those who had injured or stolen from Christians began. The headmen of the city's various quarters were arrested, although all were quickly released except for those from the quarters where the rioters had initially gathered. Those who were released were tasked with making house-to-house searches for stolen property. Individual Christians were allowed to bring charges against those who had robbed or injured them. On December 4, the governor of Aleppo issued a decree informing citizens that they had 10 days to return stolen goods, and after that, those found with stolen property would be punished as thieves and rebels.

Yet, the only property returned to court was livestock, either horses or camels, and nobody was ever punished as a thief, for proof of guilt was nearly impossible to obtain. Even the house-to-house searches yielded few results, a fact that can largely be attributed to the traditional Muslim respect for the privacy of the individual. Damage to Christian property and morale was high. Official records show that 688 homes and 36 shops were damaged. Six churches, including the Greek Catholic patriarchate and its library, were also partially destroyed. Thus, an indemnity of 5,250 purses was levied on the Muslim population of Aleppo. Although Christians claimed that this indemnity only made up a fraction of what was lost, and Muslims claimed the results were an insult on their collective honor, for they blamed the riots upon Bedouins, this proved to be the end of the restitution process.

Individuals who were identified as having been the leaders of the riots were arrested. This included both Janissary, including Abdallah, and members of the ashraf, although, significantly, only the ashraf were able to regain their positions of prestige within the city. In total, approximately 600 individuals were arrested, with 400 being drafted into the army and 200 being exiled to Crete.

Due to the fear of another outbreak of violence, hundreds of Christians emigrated from Aleppo, largely to Beirut and Smyrna. By the summer of 1851, approximately 700 individuals had left the city. The patriarch of the Syriac Catholic Church Peter VII Jarweh was fatally wounded in the attacks and died a year later. His patriarchate subsequently moved permanently from Aleppo to Mardin.

By the end of May 1851, conscription was introduced into Aleppo, and 1,000 men between the ages of 20 and 25 were taken.

After The Events, the Muslim community of Aleppo proved unwilling to attack Christians, as exemplified by the peace that was maintained in Aleppo during a wave of anti-Christian violence in 1860 that swept through Syria, despite the fact that members of the Aleppine community were called upon by religious authorities during this time to slaughter Christians.

== Implications ==
The aftermath of The Events of 1850 had numerous implications for the state of the Ottoman Empire during the Tanzimat.

Politically, The Events highlighted the success of the Ottoman state in exerting greater control over its citizens as a result of Tanzimat reforms. With modernization, citizens were no longer merely anonymous entities whose interactions with the state were defined by a series of personal relationships with government officials; rather, the state now had a standardized, impersonal bureaucracy which could successfully carry out censuses, tax individuals, and, eventually, conscript them as well. Additionally, The Events highlighted the increased ability of the State to exert its power and influence in the territories under its control through the modernization of its army, as exemplified by its successful suppression of the rioters through the use of British-bought artillery.

Some perceived the riot to be a collaboration between Abdallah al-Babinsi and Yusuf Sharayyifzadah to bolster their political prestige but this conspiracy cannot be proved true or untrue.

Economically, The Events highlighted the widespread effects of the incorporation of the Ottoman Empire into the modern world economic system. Although this incorporation was necessary for the survival of the Empire, it placed the latter in a subordinate position, in which it produced raw materials that were processed into finished goods in Europe and then sold back to the Empire at inflated prices. Such economic hardships led to depressions throughout the Empire, including the depression in Aleppo which largely affected the residents of the eastern quarters, for they were primarily engaged in the caravan trade and the grain trade.

Socially, The Events represented the transformation of the relationship between Muslims and Christians in the Empire. Increasing trade advantages for Christians within the Empire meant that, suddenly, rather than being groups that cooperated with one another during commercial transactions, Christians and Muslims became groups that competed with one another, with Muslims increasingly losing out. The consequent breakdown of corporate communities also dissolved the protection that came from these communities. The rioters were among those displaced and increasingly lost power and protection in the face of emerging Christian mercantile dominance. Christians began to advance their economic standing not through cooperation with Muslims but rather through serving as middlemen for Europeans conducting trade in the area, who would then aid in exempting them from the head taxes placed on non-Muslims and even gave them commercial advantages over local Muslim competition. The Muslim-Christian relationship shifted to one of client to patron. Christians eventually stopped doing business with Muslims and traded with only their European allegiances. The Events functioned as a sort of violent severing of the ties of civic bonds that had previously existed between the Christians and Muslims of Aleppo, as Christians became increasingly Westernized, not only culturally but also politically.

== See also ==
- Catholic–Orthodox clash in Aleppo (1818)
- Jeddah massacre of 1858
- 1860 Mount Lebanon civil war
- Massacres of Diyarbakir (1895)
- Greeks in Syria
- Late Ottoman genocides
