= Ignatius Antony I Samheri =

Head of the Syriac Catholic Church from 1853 to 1864

Mar Ignatius Antony I Samheri (Samhiri, Samhiry)
- Patriarch of Antioch
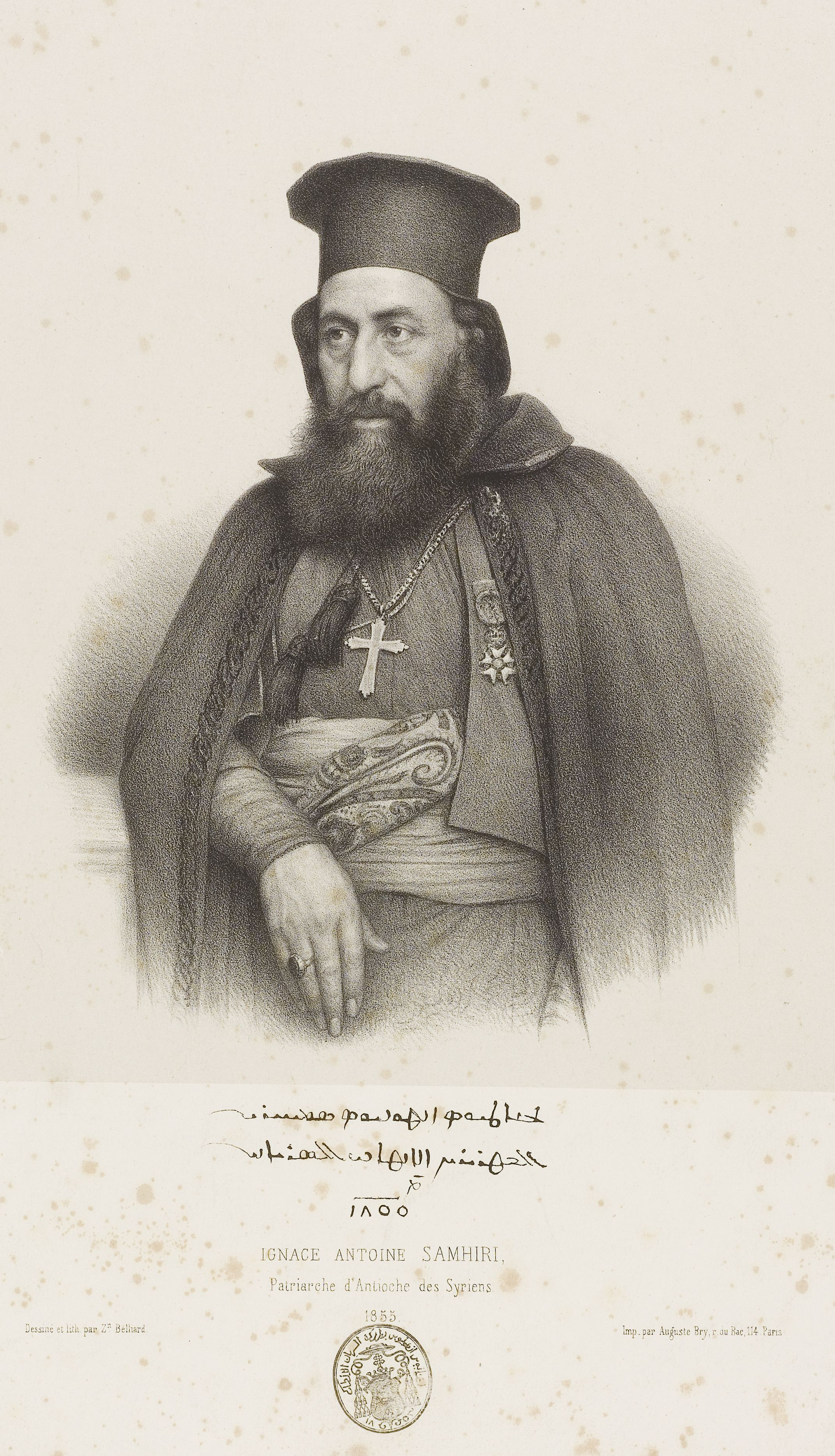
- Church: Syriac Catholic Church
- See: Patriarch of Antioch
- Installed: 8 December 1853
- Term ended: 16 June 1864
- Predecessor: Ignatius Peter VII Jarweh
- Successor: Ignatius Philip I Arkus

Orders
- Consecration: January 1826 (Bishop) by Syriac Orthodox Patriarch Ignatius George V

Personal details
- Born: Antony Samheri; 3 November 1801 Mosul, Iraq
- Died: 16 June 1864 (aged 62) Mardin, Turkey
- Residence: Mardin

Mar Ignatius Antony I Samheri (or Antun Semhiri , Samhery, Samhiri, Samhiry, 1801–1864) was a former bishop in the Syriac Orthodox Church who served as patriarch of the Syriac Catholic Church from 1853 to 1864.

== Life ==
Antony Samheri was born on 3 November 1801 in Mosul in a Syriac Orthodox family. He was ordained priest on 15 August 1822 and consecrated coadjutor bishop of Mardin in January 1826 by the Syriac Orthodox Patriarch Ignatius George V.

In the Dayr al-Zafaran monastery he found books about the Catholic Church and he took into the Catholic faith. He spoke with his patriarch who asked him to take time, but on 17 March 1828, with Grégorios Issa Mahfouz bishop of Jerusalem and one hundred fifty families, Samheri formally joined the Syriac Catholic Church. For this act he was imprisoned and humiliated for eight months, till a payment of a ransom to the local Ottoman authority. In 1840 he was appointed patriarchal vicar for the Melkite community in Amid.

He was elected patriarch of the Syriac Catholic Church on 30 November 1853, enthroned on 8 December 1853, and early in 1854 he traveled to Rome where Pope Pius IX personally invested him on 7 March 1854.

From Rome Antony Samheri went in France (he was the godfather of Louis Napoléon), Belgium and Netherlands to raise funds. After two years of traveling in Europe Rome urged him to return to his flock, where he financed the building of many churches.

He died in Mardin on 16 June 1864. The present bishops of the Syrian Catholic Church derive their apostolic succession from him.

== Sources ==
- Frazee, Charles A. (2006) [1983]. Catholics and Sultans: The Church and the Ottoman Empire 1453-1923. Cambridge: Cambridge University Press. ISBN 9780521027007.
