= George II of Antioch =

- Greek Orthodox Patriarch of Antioch
- Church: Church of Antioch
- See: Antioch
- Installed: 691
- Term ended: 702
- Predecessor: Sebastian of Antioch

George II of Antioch was Greek Orthodox Patriarch of Antioch in the 7th century. Little is known about him except that he attended the Quinisext Council in 691–692. It is speculated that he died of heat exhaustion caused by a long period of being outdoors. After his death the period of Arab tolerance that had allowed the continued existence of Christianity in regions under their domination ended. George II of Antioch's reign was one well known for peace, due to his love of many religions. The Byzantine Empire, it is thought, worked alongside him to be able to better the Empire altogether.
