= Ignatius George III =

109th Patriarch of the Syriac Orthodox Church of Antioch (1745–1768)

- Syriac Orthodox Patriarch of Antioch and All the East
- Church: Syriac Orthodox Church
- See: Antioch
- Installed: 1745
- Term ended: 1768
- Predecessor: Ignatius Shukrallah II
- Successor: Ignatius George IV

Personal details
- Born: George; 1688 Edessa, Ottoman Empire
- Died: 1768 (aged 79–80) Diyarbakir, Ottoman Empire
- Residence: Diyarbakir, Ottoman Empire

Ignatius George III was the Patriarch of Antioch and head of the Syriac Orthodox Church from 1745 until his death in 1768.

== Biography ==
George was born in Edessa around 1688 and his father Shm’oun was the nephew of the patriarch Abdulmassih I who was also from Edessa. George studied under the patriarch Ignatius Isaac II and in 1722, he was ordained as an ecumenical metropolitan and was called Basil. After Ignatius Shukrallah II was elected as a new patriarch, he appointed him as Metropolitan of Aleppo and gave him the name Dionysus 00where he stayed there about 18 year.

== Patriarchal consecration ==
Three days after patriarch Ignatius Shukrallah II died, two metropolitans met in Amid and along with the clergy and the faithful sent letters to Dionysus George in Aleppo asking him to travel to Amid for consultations. After three days of deliberations, the metropolitans who met there, chose him to be the new patriarch and he was consecrated in October 1745 as Ignatius George III. After he was consecrated, he travelled to the capitol, Istanbul, and received the royal decree and then appointed a permanent representative for the church in the capital. In 1748, he appointed Metropolitan Shukrallah of Aleppo as a Maphrian of Malabar in India to travel to India and resolve some issues between the clergy there. He also paid attention to building and renovating church and monasteries buildings and translate some books.

== Episcopal succession ==
During Ignatius George III time as Patriarch and Metropolitan, he had the duty to ordain and consecrate many Metropolitans in the Syria Orthodox church in addition to tens of priests, monks, and deacons

1. Dionysus Shukrallah (1746–1748). Metropolitan of Aleppo. Later, he was appointed as Maphrian of Malabar in India (1748-1764)
2. Severus Yuhanna (1749-1768). Metropolitan of Malabar and then of Gargar
3. Cyril Rizqallh (1749-1772). Bishop of the Patriarchal Office and then Metropolitan of Mosul and Mor Mattai Monastery
4. Athanasius Abdulkarim (1749-1755) Metropolitan of the Patriarchal office
5. Gregorius Thomas (1750-1752). Metropolitan of the Monastery of Mor Elias in Qarqart
6. Timothy Thomas (1752-1773). Metropolitan of the Patriarchal office, then of Gargar, of Edessa, and lastly of Amid
7. Gregorius Yuhanna (1754-1783). Metropolitan of Damascus (1754-1783)
8. Gregorius Shamoun (1760-1772). Metropolitan of Bushairiyya
9. Basil George (1760-1768). Maphrian of the East. Later, he was elected Ignatius George IV, the 110th patriarch of the Syriac Orthodox Church
10. Gregorius Behnam (1761-1769). Metropolitan of Ma’dan
11. Iyawannis Behnam (1763-1776). Metropolitan of the Monastery of Mor Behnam
12. Dionysius Michael (1766-1775). Metropolitan of Aleppo.

== Death ==
Ignatius George III died in July 1768 and was buried in the tomb of his great uncle Ignatius Abdulmasih I in the Syriac cemetery outside the wall of Diyarbakir

Preceded by Ignatius Isaac II	Syriac Orthodox Patriarch of Antioch; 1745-1768	Succeeded by Ignatius George IV
