= List of maphrians =

List of Syriac Orthodox Maphrians

The Maphrian, originally known as the Grand Metropolitan of the East or the Catholicos, was the head of the Maphrianate of the East and was the second highest-ranking prelate within the Syriac Orthodox Church, after the Patriarch of Antioch. The maphrianate originated as a distinct miaphysite ecclesiastical institution in the Sasanian Empire after the ordination of Ahudemmeh as Grand Metropolitan of the East by Jacob Baradaeus in 559. However, it claimed to be the legitimate continuation of the Church of the East and counted its leaders prior to the church's adoption of dyophysitism as its own. Sources disagree on the first to use the title of maphrian as Michael the Syrian's Chronicle gives John IV Saliba, who is believed to have adopted it in c. 1100, whereas Bar Hebraeus' Ecclesiastical History names Marutha of Tikrit as the first. Eventually, the Maphrianate of the East was abolished in 1860.

A separate maphrianate of Tur Abdin under the authority of the Patriarch of Tur Abdin was established in c. 1479 and endured until 1844. A maphrianate in India was established in 1912, thereby creating the Malankara Orthodox Syrian Church, but was not recognised by the Syriac Orthodox Church until 1958. In 1975, Patriarch Ignatius Jacob III withdrew recognition of the maphrian Baselios Augen I, and appointed Baselios Paulose II in his stead. The Malankara Orthodox Syrian Church thus split from the Syriac Orthodox Church which continues to appoint its own maphrians in India. On March 25, 2025, Baselios Joseph was enthroned as the 81st Maphrian of the Syriac Orthodox Church.

== List of maphrians ==
=== Grand Metropolitans of the East from 559 to 1075 ===
Unless otherwise stated, all information is from the list provided in The Syriac World, as noted in the bibliography below. According to church tradition, numeration includes incumbents deemed legitimate by the Syriac Orthodox Church prior to 559.

- Ahudemmeh (559–575)
  vacant (575–578)
- Qamishoʿ (578–609)
  vacant (609–614)
- Samuel (614–624)
  vacant (624–628/629)
- Marutha of Tikrit (628/629–649) (Note: Marutha of Tikrit is named as the first maphrian, as per Bar Hebraeus' Ecclesiastical History, and this is supported by a number of scholars, such as George Kiraz, whereas Michael the Syrian's Chronicle gives John IV Saliba as the first maphrian, which is supported by scholars David Wilmshurst and Hidemi Takahashi.)
- Denha I (649–659) (Note: The French orientalist Rubens Duval asserts that Denha I was the first maphrian.)
  vacant (659–669)
- Barishoʿ (669–683)
- Abraham I (c. 684) (Note: Abraham is counted as either Abraham I or Abraham II.)
- David (c. 684–c. 686)
- John I Saba (686–688)
- Denha II (688–727)
- Paul I (728–757)
- John II Kionoyo (759–785)
- Joseph I (785–c. 790)
  vacant (c. 790–793)
- Sharbil (793–ca. 800)
- Simon (c. 800–c. 815) (Note: Barsoum places Simon's reign in 806–c. 813.)
- Basil I (c. 815–829)
- Daniel (829–834)
- Thomas (834–847)
- Basil II Lazarus I (848–858)
- Melchisedec (858–868)
  vacant (869–872)
- Sergius (872–883)
  vacant (883–887)
- Athanasius I (887–903)
  vacant (904–c. 910)
- Thomas (910–911)
- Denha III (913–933)
  vacant (933–937)
- Basil III (937–961)
- Cyriacus (962–980)
- John III (981–988)
  vacant (988–991)
- Ignatius I bar Qiqi (991–1016)
  vacant (1016–1027)
- Athanasius II (1027–1041)
  vacant (1041–1046)
- Basil IV (1046–1069)
  vacant (1069–1075)

=== Maphrians of the East from 1075 to 1859 ===
- John IV Saliba (1075–1106)
  vacant (1106–1112)
- Dionysius I Moses (1112–1142)
- Ignatius II Lazarus II (1142–1164)
- John V Sarugoyo (1164–1188)
- Gregory I Jacob (1189–1214)
  Dionysius bar Masih (1189–1190) (Note: Dionysius is considered an illegitimate maphrian.)
- Ignatius III David (1215–1222)
- Dionysius II Saliba I (1222–1231)
- John VI bar Maʿdani (1232–1252)
- Ignatius IV Saliba (1253–1258)
  vacant (1258–1263)
- Gregory II bar Hebraeus (1264–1286)
  vacant (1286–1288)
- Gregory III Barsawmo (1288–1308) (Note: Gregory is also counted as Barsawmo I.)
  vacant (1308–1317)
- Gregory IV Matthew (1317–1345) (Note: Gregory is also counted as Matthew I.)
  vacant (1345–1360)
  Gregory V Dioscorus (1360–1361) (Note: Gregory is considered an illegitimate maphrian. He is also counted as Dioscorus I.)
  vacant (1361–1364)
- Athanasius III Abraham (1364–1379) (Note: Athanasius is also counted as Abraham II.)
  vacant (1379–1404)
- Basil Behnam I (1404–1412)
  vacant (1412–1415)
- Dioscorus Behnam Shatti (1415–1417) (Note: Dioscorus is counted as either Dioscorus II or Behnam II.)
  vacant (1417–1422)
- Basil Barsawmo II (1422–1455)
  vacant (1455–1458)
  Cyril Joseph II (1458–c. 1470)
- Basil ʿAziz (1471–1487)
  vacant (1487–1490)
- Basil Noah (1490–1494)
  vacant (1494–1496)
- Basil Abraham III (1496–1507)
  vacant (1507–1509)
- Basil Solomon (1509–1518)
- Basil Athanasius Habib (1518–1533)
- Basil Elias I (1533–c. 1554)
- Basil Ni'matallah (1555–1557)
- Basil ʿAbd al-Ghani I al-Mansuri (1557–1575)
- Basil Pilate (1575–1591)
  Elias II (c. 1590)
- Basil ʿAbd al-Ghani II (1591–1597)
- Basil Peter Hadaya (1597–1598)
  vacant (c. 1598–c. 1624)
- Basil Isaiah (c. 1624–1635/c. 1646) (Note: The end of Basil Isaiah's reign is placed either in 1635 by Barsoum, or in c. 1646 by Wilmshurst.)
- Basil Simon (1635–1639)
- Basil Shukrallah (1639–1652)
- Basil Behnam III (1653–1655)
- Basil Abdulmasih (1655–c. 1658)
- Basil Habib (c. 1658–c. 1671)
- Basil Yeldo (c. 1671–1683)
- Basil George (1683–1686)
- Basil Isaac (1687–1709)
- Basil Lazarus III (1709–1713)
- Basil Matthew II (1713–1727)
- Basil Simon (c. 1727–c. 1729)
- Basil Lazarus IV (1730–1759)
  Basil Shukrallah (1748–1764) (Note: Basil Shukrallah was maphrian of Malabar.)
- Basil George (1760–1768)
  vacant (1768–1783)
- Basil Sliba (1783–1790)
- Basil Bishara (1790–1817)
- Basil Yunan (c. 1803–c. 1809)
- Basil Cyril (c. 1803–c. 1811)
- Basil ʿAbd al-ʿAziz (c. 1803)
- Basil Matthew (1820–c. 1825)
- Basil Elias III Karmeh (1825–1827)
- Basil Elias IV ʿAnkaz (1827–1839)
- Basil Behnam IV (1839–1859)

=== Maphrians of Tur Abdin from c. 1479 to 1844 ===
- Basil (c. 1479)
  vacant (c. 1479–1495)
- Basil Malke (1495–1510)
  vacant (1510–1537)
- Basil Abraham (1537–1543)
  vacant (1543–1555)
- Basil Simon I (1549–1555)
  vacant (1555–1561)
- Basil Behnam (1561–1562)
  vacant (1562–1650)
- Basil Habib Haddad (1650–1674)
  vacant (1674–c. 1688)
- Basil Lazarus (c. 1688–c. 1701)
  vacant (c. 1701–1710)
- Basil Simon II (1710–1740)
- Basil Denha Baltaji (1740–1779)
- Basil ʿAbdallah Yahya (1779–1784)
- Simon (1786)
- Sliba al-ʿAttar (1779–1815)
- Basil Barsawmo (1815–1830)
- Basil ʿAbd al-Ahad Kindo (1821–1844)

=== Maphrians of the Malankara Orthodox Syrian Church from 1912 to 1964 ===
- Baselios Paulose I (1912–1913) (Note: At the beginning of the 20th century there surfaced disputes within the Malankara Church, the Indian branch that aligned with the Syriac Orthodox Church. This led to a major split between two rival parties that either supported the patriarch, Ignatius Abdulla II Sattuf, or the metropolitan, Dionysius VI Geevarghese Vattasseril. In 1912, following the split in the Malankara Church, the deposed patriarch Ignatius Abdalmasih II re-established the maphrianate in India, at the request of the independent faction, and elevated Murimattathil Ivanios Paulose of the metropolitan's party to the rank of Maphrian or Catholicos.)
  vacant (1913–1925)
- Baselios Geevarghese I (1925–1928)
- Baselios Geevarghese II (1929–1964)

=== Maphrians of the East since 1964 ===
- Baselios Augen I (1964–1975) (Note: In 1958, as part of the reconciliation between the two factions of the Malankara Church, Patriarch Ignatius Yacoub III officially recognised Baselios Geevarghese II as catholicos and following the death of Geevarghese II in 1964, the patriarch elevated Timotheos Augen of Kandanad as the successor.)
- Baselios Paulose II (1975–1996) (Note: In 1975, Patriarch Ignatius Jacob III excommunicated Baselios Augen I, and appointed Baselios Paulose II in his stead as the new Maphrian.)
  vacant (1996–2002)
- Baselios Thomas I (2002–2024)
- Baselios Joseph (2025–present)

== See also ==
- List of patriarchs of the Church of the East
- List of Syriac Orthodox patriarchs of Antioch
- List of Syriac Catholic patriarchs of Antioch

== Bibliography ==
- Barsoum, Aphrem (2003). The Scattered Pearls: A History of Syriac Literature and Sciences. Translated by Matti Moosa (2nd ed.). Gorgias Press.
- Barsoum, Aphrem (2008). The History of Tur Abdin. Translated by Matti Moosa. Gorgias Press.
- Barsoum, Aphrem (2009). The Collected Historical Essays of Aphram I Barsoum. Vol. 1. Translated by Matti Moosa. Gorgias Press.
- Baum, Wilhelm; Winkler, Dietmar W. (2003). The Church of the East: A Concise History. Translated by Miranda G. Henry. RoutledgeCurzon.
- Duval, Rubens (2013). Syriac Literature. Translated by Olivier Holmey. Gorgias Press.
- Ignatius Jacob III (2008). History of the Monastery of Saint Matthew in Mosul. Translated by Matti Moosa. Gorgias Press.
- Joseph, Thomas (2011). "Malankara Syriac Orthodox Church". In Sebastian P. Brock; Aaron M. Butts; George A. Kiraz; Lucas Van Rompay (eds.). Gorgias Encyclopedic Dictionary of the Syriac Heritage: Electronic Edition. Gorgias Press.
- Kiraz, George A. (2011). "Maphrian". In Sebastian P. Brock; Aaron M. Butts; George A. Kiraz; Lucas Van Rompay (eds.). Gorgias Encyclopedic Dictionary of the Syriac Heritage: Electronic Edition. Gorgias Press.
- Takahashi, Hidemi (2018). "Maphrian". In Oliver Nicholson (ed.). The Oxford Dictionary of Late Antiquity. Oxford University Press. p. 957.
- Varghese, Baby (2011). "Malankara Orthodox Syrian Church". In Sebastian P. Brock; Aaron M. Butts; George A. Kiraz; Lucas Van Rompay (eds.). Gorgias Encyclopedic Dictionary of the Syriac Heritage: Electronic Edition. Gorgias Press.
- Weltecke, Dorothea (2016). "Bar ʻEbroyo on Identity: Remarks on his Historical Writing". Hugoye: Journal of Syriac Studies: 303–332.
- Wilmshurst, David (2019). "West Syrian patriarchs and maphrians". In Daniel King (ed.). The Syriac World. Routledge. pp. 806–813.
- Wood, Philip (2013). The Chronicle of Seert: Christian Historical Imagination in Late Antique Iraq. Oxford University Press.
- Wood, Phillip John (2021). "Miaphysites in Iraq during the Last Great War of Antiquity (c. 604–28) and its Aftermath". The Journal of Ecclesiastical History: 1–18.
