= Marutha of Tikrit =

Saint and 1st Maphrian of the East of Syriac Orthodox Church of Antioch

- Syriac Orthodox Grand Metropolitan of the East
- Church: Syriac Orthodox Church
- Installed: 628 or 629
- Term ended: 649
- Predecessor: Samuel
- Successor: Denha I

Personal details
- Born: c. 565 Shawarzaq, Sasanian Empire
- Died: 2 May 649 (aged 83–84)

Sainthood
- Feast day: 1 May, 2 May, 10 May
- Venerated in: Syriac Orthodox Church

Marutha of Tikrit (Syriac: ܡܪܘܬܐ ܕܬܓܪܝܬ, Arabic: ماروثا التكريتي, Latin: Marutha Tagrithesis) was the Grand Metropolitan of the East and head of the Syriac Orthodox Church of the East from 628 or 629 until his death in 649. He is commemorated as a saint by the Syriac Orthodox Church.

== Biography ==
=== Early life and education ===
Marutha was born to an affluent family in c. 565 at the village of Shawarzaq in the region of Beth Nuhadra, and his father was chief of the village. He was educated at the nearby monastery of Saint Samuel before moving to schools in the villages of Beth Qiq, Beth Tarle, Tell Salma, and Beth Banu. He became a monk and priest at the monastery of Nardos, where he was made a teacher and the bishop Zacchaeus appointed him as his deputy. Marutha then entered the monastery of Saint Zacchaeus, near Raqqa in Syria, to study Greek, Syriac, and theology, in particular the work of Gregory of Nazianzus, under the monk Theodore for ten years. Subsequently, he sequestered himself as a hermit near Edessa, during which time he mastered calligraphy, and then moved to the monastery of Beth Raqum, near Balad, and studied under the monk Thomas.

=== Monkhood ===
The non-Chalcedonian miaphysites (later termed Syriac Orthodox) of Beth Nuhadra twice appealed to Marutha to become their bishop, and whilst he refused to assume the office, on the second occasion, he agreed to travel to the region to provide teaching. In this effort, he entered the monastery of Saint Matthew in 605. He taught theology and scriptural studies to the monks, including a certain Denha, for a time. From there, he travelled to the monastery of Shirin at Ctesiphon, the capital of the Sasanian Empire, at which he issued canons and encouraged scriptural studies. In his canons, he forbade Christians of other sects from participating in the celebration of the Eucharist with miaphysites. Marutha was offered an episcopal see by Samuel, Grand Metropolitan of the East, but refused; sources disagree as to which see he was offered as Denha's Life of Marutha states Samuel had aimed to appoint Marutha as bishop of Tikrit, whereas Bar Hebraeus' Ecclesiastical History purports that Samuel wanted to give Marutha his own office as Grand Metropolitan of the East. At this time, he also preached at Tikrit and converted a significant number of people there.

At Ctesiphon, Marutha received the patronage of the miaphysite court physician Gabriel of Sinjar and found favour at the court of the Shahanshah Khosrow II, who conducted a pro-miaphysite policy in order to gain their cooperation and loyalty during the Roman–Sasanian War of 602–628. However, in the closing stages of the war, by which point the Roman Emperor Heraclius had reversed the tide and made significant advances into the heartland of the Sasanian Empire, miaphysites faced renewed persecution. Following the death of Gabriel of Sinjar, Marutha took refuge at the monastery of Rabban Shapur at Aqula before returning to the monastery of Saint Matthew and resumed his teaching there. The war came to an end at this time as the Roman Empire achieved victory over the Sasanian Empire, and a Roman governor was established at Tikrit.

=== Grand Metropolitan of the East ===
Upon the return of peace to the region, Athanasius I Gammolo, miaphysite Patriarch of Antioch, resolved to re-establish the union between the miaphysites in the Roman and Sasanian empires and sent his syncellus (secretary) John to achieve this. After meeting with Shahanshah Ardashir III, John travelled to the monastery of Saint Matthew and successfully convinced the monastery's archbishop Christopher, archimandrite Addai, and its monks to agree to restore the union. A synod was thereafter convened by Christopher and attended by the bishops George of Sinjar, Daniel of Beth Nuhadra, Gregory of Beth Ramman, and Yardafne of Shahrzur, which concluded in favour of the restoration of union. It was decided that they would travel to Athanasius to confirm the union and Marutha, with the monks Ith Alaha and Aha, were chosen to join them in their journey and be ordained as bishops, prior to which they travelled to Tikrit to discuss the union.

In 628 or 629 (AG 940), John returned to Athanasius with Marutha and the others, and the union was restored. Marutha was successively ordained as bishop of Beth Arbaye by Christopher and then archbishop of Tikrit and Grand Metropolitan of the East by Athanasius. Bar Hebraeus in his Ecclesiastical History names Marutha as the first miaphysite Grand Metropolitan of the East to hold the title maphrian, however, it was likely not in use until c. 1100. With their goal achieved, the group proceeded to the monastery of Saint Matthew to convene a synod to arrange the ecclesiastical structure of the miaphysite church in the Sasanian Empire (later termed the Syriac Orthodox Church of the East). Sources disagree on the agreement reached at the synod as the letter of Athanasius in Michael the Syrian's Chronicle places the twelve eastern dioceses under Marutha's authority, whereas the canons of the monastery of Saint Matthew record that the twelve dioceses were divided equally between the monastery and the archdiocese of Tikrit.

Marutha then established himself at Tikrit and was accepted by his congregation after initial opposition. He went on to build a monastery of Saint Sergius at Ayn Jaj, between Tikrit and Hit, and a monastery of the Virgin Mary at Beth Ibro. Also, with the aid of Abraham bar Yeshu, governor of Tikrit, Marutha constructed a cathedral in the city's citadel. In response to the appeals of miaphysites from Edessa who had been forcibly resettled in the Sasanian Empire, he ordained and dispatched bishops of Adurbadagan, Sakastan, and Herat. In 637, at the time of the Muslim conquest of Mesopotamia, Marutha led the surrender of Tikrit to Muslim forces to spare its inhabitants after it had come under siege.

=== Later life and death ===
Marutha served as Grand Metropolitan of the East until his death on 2 May 649 (AG 960), and he was buried at the cathedral in the citadel of Tikrit. He was commemorated in a hagiography by his pupil and successor Denha I, and later also added to the calendar of saints of Jacob of Edessa and Saliba bar Khayrun.

== Works ==
Marutha is named as the author of a homily on Low Sunday (Brit. Mus. MS. 848) by Aphrem Barsoum, whereas Mihály Kmoskó alternatively attributes it to Maruthas of Martyropolis. He wrote a commentary on the Gospels, of which only quotations of his comments on Exodus 16:1 and Matthew 26:6–14 survive in the catena of the monk Severus, compiled in 861. It is attested in Denha's biography of Marutha that the latter wrote a polemical treatise against the dyophysite Church of the East, which has since been lost. Marutha composed an anaphora that was later included in the Maronite missal of 1592, and a book of propitiatory prayers (Syriac: ḥusoyo) for Holy Week. He is credited as the author of Ahudemmeh's hagiography and at least one prayer of supplication (Syriac: sedro). In addition, he wrote a homily on the blessing of waters at Epiphany.

A letter from Marutha to John, who succeeded Athanasius as patriarch of Antioch, is preserved in Michael the Syrian's Chronicle, in which he alleges the adoption of Nestorianism by the Church of the East and the dyophysite archbishop Barsauma's role in the persecution of miaphysites.

== Bibliography ==
- Barsoum, Aphrem (2003). The Scattered Pearls: A History of Syriac Literature and Sciences. Translated by Matti Moosa (2nd ed.). Gorgias Press.
- Barsoum, Aphrem (2009). The Collected Historical Essays of Aphram I Barsoum. Vol. 1. Translated by Matti Moosa. Gorgias Press.
- Brock, Sebastian P. (2011). "Marutha of Tagrit". In Sebastian P. Brock; Aaron M. Butts; George A. Kiraz; Lucas Van Rompay (eds.). Gorgias Encyclopedic Dictionary of the Syriac Heritage: Electronic Edition. Beth Mardutho. pp. 273–274.
- Duval, Rubens (2013). Syriac Literature. Translated by Olivier Holmey. Gorgias Press.
- Fiey, Jean Maurice (2004). Lawrence Conrad (ed.). Saints Syriaques (in French). The Darwin Press.
- Ignatius Jacob III (2008). History of the Monastery of Saint Matthew in Mosul. Translated by Matti Moosa. Gorgias Press.
- Kramers, Johannes Hendrik; Bosworth, Clifford Edmund (1986). "Takrīt". Encyclopaedia of Islam, Second Edition. Vol. 10. pp. 140–141.
- Mazzola, Marianna, ed. (2018). Bar 'Ebroyo's Ecclesiastical History : writing Church History in the 13th century Middle East. PSL Research University.
- Mazzola, Marianna (2019). "Centralism and Local Tradition : A Reappraisal of the Sources on the Metropolis of Tagrit and Mor Matay". Le Muséon. 132 (3–4): 399–413.
- Nicholson, Oliver, ed. (2018). The Oxford Dictionary of Late Antiquity. Oxford University Press.
- Renard, John (2020). Crossing Confessional Boundaries: Exemplary Lives in Jewish, Christian, and Islamic Traditions. University of California Press.
- Wood, Philip (2013). The Chronicle of Seert: Christian Historical Imagination in Late Antique Iraq. Oxford University Press.

Preceded by Samuel	Syriac Orthodox Grand Metropolitan of the East; 628/629–649	Succeeded by Denha I
