= Syriac Orthodox Archdiocese of Baghdad and Basra =

The Syriac Orthodox Archdiocese of Baghdad and Basra is an archdiocese of the Syriac Orthodox Church in Iraq. The episcopate of Baghdad is attested between 818 and 1265 as part of the Maphrianate of the East. (Note: According to Barsoum, there were nine metropolitans in this period, however, Fiey names only eight.) The archdiocese was re-established in 1960. The incumbent metropolitan of Baghdad and Basra is Mor Saverius Jamil Hawa.

== History ==
By the end of the 8th century, Syriac Orthodox Christians had established a significant presence at Baghdad. Habib, the first metropolitan of Baghdad, attended the synod of Raqqa in 818. Lazarus bar Sabtha, metropolitan of Baghdad, was deposed by Patriarch Dionysius I Telmaharoyo in 826. (Note: Also known as Li’azar (Lazarus) bar Sobto (the old woman).) In October or November 829 (AG 1141), Dionysius I Telmaharoyo appointed a bishop to replace Lazarus as metropolitan of Baghdad. John, the only bishop of Baghdad mentioned by Michael the Syrian, attended a council at Tikrit convened by Dionysius I Telmaharoyo in November 834. (Note: According to Fiey, John was bishop of Baghdad in 828 and 835.) Basil Thomas was metropolitan of Baghdad in 923. The Convent of Nuns at Baghdad was still active in 1002. The Church of Mar Tuma at the Muhawwal Gate in the Kharkh district of Baghdad, also known as the Church of Qati’at al-Daqiq, was burned down by Muslims in 1002 and rebuilt by the Maphrian Ignatius in 1004. Yohannan V, Patriarch of the Church of the East (r. 1000–1011), obtained a decree from the caliph prohibiting the maphrian from residing at Baghdad during Maphrian Ignatius bar Qiqi's visit to the city in 1003/1004.

At Baghdad, there was also the Church of the Virgin. Thomas Hiba was metropolitan of Baghdad in 1088. The bishop of Baghdad wrote to Patriarch Athanasius VI bar Khamoro to warn him not to consecrate the priest Abu Shakhir the Tagritian, from Mosul, as maphrian in 1112. Basil, also known as Mattai bar Shwayak of lower Beth Daniel, metropolitan of Baghdad, supported Karim bar Masih, a monk from the Mor Mattai Monastery, in his bid to become maphrian in 1189. (Note: Also known as Basil Matta ibn Shadjak or Basilius Matta bar Shawbak.) The Church of Mar Tuma at Baghdad is mentioned by Yaqut al-Hamawi (d. 1229). Athanasius Shemʿon bar Summaneh was metropolitan of Baghdad in 1237. Maphrian Yuḥanon bar Maʿdani (r. 1232–1253) spent several years residing at Baghdad. Timothy Ishoʿ, a monk of the Monastery of Mar Hnanya, was ordained as metropolitan of Baghdad by the Maphrian Bar Hebraeus in 1265. Bar Hebraeus also built a church near the caliph's palace. The church near the caliph's residence at Baghdad was renovated in 1274 by chief clerk (secretary of state) Safi al-Dawla Sulayman ibn al-Jamal of Baghdad. In the 17th century, the French traveller Jean-Baptiste Tavernier noted the presence of Syriac Orthodox Christians at Baghdad, who did not have a church and thus received the sacraments from the Capuchins, and at Basra.

Rabban Jacob of Mosul was sent to Baghdad to build a church at the end of 1918. Rabban Jacob of Mosul was appointed as the patriarchal representative in Baghdad by Patriarch Ignatius Aphrem I on 10 May 1934. The Church of the Virgin at Basra was built in 1933. The Church of St Thomas the Apostle at Baghdad was built in 1934. The Church of the Virgin at Baghdad was built in 1934. A church was also constructed at Basra in 1934 by Rabban Jacob of Mosul. Rabban Jacob of Mosul served as the patriarchal representative in Baghdad for 12 years and was ordained as metropolitan of the Mor Mattai Monastery on 23 June 1946. The new church at Baghdad was consecrated by Gregorius Bulus Behnam, metropolitan of Mosul, and Timothy II, Jacob, metropolitan of the Mor Mattai Monastery, on 13 November 1955. The Cathedral of St Peter and St Paul was constructed at Baghdad in 1962–1964 and was consecrated by Patriarch Ignatius Yaq'ub III on 9 March 1964. Around half of the 100 Syriac Orthodox families in Kuwait and Basra left after the Gulf War in 1990. By 1998, more than half of the 50,000 Syriac Orthodox Christians in Iraq inhabited Baghdad, which had 6 churches, and there were 60 Syriac Orthodox families at Basra. The Church of Mar Behnam at Baghdad was under construction in 1998.

The St Jacob Baradeus Monastery for Nuns was opened in Baghdad in 2002. The Church of Saint Thomas in the Mansour neighbourhood of Baghdad was attacked in October 2004. The Church of St Bahnam and St Mattay at Dora in Baghdad was damaged in a bomb attack by militants which killed 3 people and injured 34 people on 8 November 2004. By 2005, the archdiocese had 5 clergy, all of whom were located at Baghdad. There were 7 Syriac Orthodox churches at Baghdad in 2005. Fr. Youssef Abdel, the priest of Sts Peter and Paul Cathedral in Baghdad, was shot dead on 5 April 2008. The Church of St Peter and Paul at Baghdad was targeted by a car bomb attack on 12 July 2009. On 20 March 2012, the Church of St. Matthew in Baghdad was bombed and two guards were killed and five people were wounded.

== Ecclesiastical properties ==
The following ecclesiastical properties belong to the archdiocese:

- Church of Saint Thomas, Mansour neighbourhood, Baghdad
- Cathedral of Saint Peter and Saint Paul, Baghdad
- Church of Saint Bahnam and Saint Mattay, Dora, Baghdad
- Church of Saint Matthew, Baghdad
- Church of the Virgin, Baghdad
- Saint Jacob Baradeus Monastery for Nuns, Baghdad
- Church of Saint Mary, Basra.

== List of archbishops ==
The following is a list of incumbents of the see following the restoration of the archdiocese:

- Gregorius Bulus Behnam (1962–1969)
- Severus Zakka Iwas (1969–1980)
- Saverius Jamil Hawa (1981–present)

== Bibliography ==
- Barsoum, Aphrem (2009). The Collected Historical Essays of Aphram I Barsoum. Vol. 1. Translated by Matti Moosa. Gorgias Press.
- Chabot, Jean-Baptiste, ed. (1905). Chronique de Michel le Syrien. Vol. III. Paris: Ernest Leroux.
- Chaillot, Christine (1998). The Syrian Orthodox Church of Antioch and All the East: A Brief Introduction to Its Life and Spirituality.
- Fiey, Jean Maurice (1993). Pour un Oriens Christianus Novus: Répertoire des diocèses syriaques orientaux et occidentaux (in French).
- Ignatius Jacob III (2008). History of the Monastery of Saint Matthew in Mosul. Translated by Matti Moosa. Gorgias Press.
- Takahashi, Hidemi (2011). "Baghdad". In Sebastian P. Brock; Aaron M. Butts; George A. Kiraz; Lucas Van Rompay (eds.). Gorgias Encyclopedic Dictionary of the Syriac Heritage. Gorgias Press. pp. 50–51.
- Tavernier, Jean-Baptiste (1678). The six voyages of John Baptista Tavernier, a noble man of France now living, through Turky into Persia and the East-Indies, finished in the year 1670 giving an account of the state of those countries : illustrated with divers sculptures ; together with a new relation of the present Grand Seignor's seraglio, by the same author.
- Wilmshurst, David (2016). Bar Hebraeus The Ecclesiastical Chronicle: An English Translation. Gorgias Press.
