= Qamishoʿ =

Syriac Orthodox Grand Metropolitan of the East, 578-609

- Syriac Orthodox Grand Metropolitan of the East
- Church: Syriac Orthodox Church
- Installed: 578
- Term ended: 609
- Predecessor: Ahudemmeh
- Successor: Samuel

Personal details
- Died: 609

Qamishoʿ (Note: Alternatively transliterated as Qam Yeshu' ("Jesus is risen" in Syriac).) was the Syriac Orthodox Grand Metropolitan of the East from 578 until his death in 609.

== Biography ==
According to Bar Hebraeus' Ecclesiastical History, Qamishoʿ was the teacher at the miaphysite (later termed Syriac Orthodox) church near the royal palace at Ctesiphon, the capital of the Sasanian Empire. After the death of the Sasanian Shahanshah Khosrow I and his succession by his son Hormizd IV, permission was granted to the miaphysites to perform an election for the office of Grand Metropolitan of the East, which had lain vacant for several years following Ahudemmeh's execution on the orders of Khosrow I in 575. Qamishoʿ was elected as Grand Metropolitan of the East at the aforementioned church aside the royal palace in 578 (AG 889).

As Grand Metropolitan of the East, Qamishoʿ ordained a number of bishops, and served until his death in 609 (AG 920). It is suggested by the historian Philip Wood that Qamishoʿ was not included in the Syriac Orthodox synaxarium as he may have collaborated with the Sasanian government during the Roman–Sasanian War of 602–628 in a manner that was later deemed unsuitable.

== Bibliography ==
- Ignatius Jacob III (2008). History of the Monastery of Saint Matthew in Mosul. Translated by Matti Moosa. Gorgias Press.
- Mazzola, Marianna, ed. (2018). Bar ‘Ebroyo’s Ecclesiastical History : writing Church History in the 13th century Middle East. PSL Research University.
- Wood, Phillip John (2021). "Miaphysites in Iraq during the Last Great War of Antiquity (c. 604–28) and its Aftermath". The Journal of Ecclesiastical History: 1–18.

Preceded by Ahudemmeh	Syriac Orthodox Grand Metropolitan of the East; 578–609	Succeeded by Samuel
