= Denha =

Denha (Syriac script ܕܢܚܐ, denḥa) is the Classical Syriac word for an epiphany, and a masculine name of Neo-Aramaic origin. It is predominantly used by ethnic Assyrians, who follow churches of the Syriac-rite.

Denha is originally a noun from both Classical Syriac and Assyrian Neo-Aramaic, which translates to "shine". The word can be inferred to as a shining light literally, or metaphorically as an epiphany/manifestation. It can be used as both a given name and a surname, and can also alternatively be used as Dinkha.

The word may refer to:

== Epiphany ==
In Syriac Christianity, "Denha" is used in reference to the feast of the epiphany, and is connected to the expression of rising light in Luke 1:78.

- Epiphany (holiday)
- Epiphany season

== People ==
People with the name Denha as a given name or surname include:

- Denha I of Tikrit, Syriac Orthodox Grand Metropolitan of the East from 649 to 659
- Denha I, Patriarch of the Church of the East from 1265 to 1281
- Denha II, Patriarch of the Church of the East from c. 1336 to c. 1382
- Ignatius Denha of 'Arnas, Patriarch of Tur Abdin from 1707 to 1725
- Shemʿon VIII Denha, a non-existent patriarch during the schism of 1552
- Shemʿon IX Denha, Patriarch of the Church of the East from c. 1581 to c. 1600

== See also ==
- Dinkha
