= Samuel of Ctesiphon =

Syriac Orthodox Grand Metropolitan of the East, 614-624

Samuel
- Syriac Orthodox Grand Metropolitan of the East
- Church: Syriac Orthodox Church
- Installed: 614
- Term ended: 624
- Predecessor: Qamishoʿ
- Successor: Marutha

Personal details
- Died: 624

Samuel was the Syriac Orthodox Grand Metropolitan of the East from 614 until his death in 624.

== Biography ==
According to Bar Hebraeus' Ecclesiastical History, Samuel was appointed as the miaphysite (later termed Syriac Orthodox) Grand Metropolitan of the East in 614 (AG 925), during the reign of the Sasanian Shahanshah Khosrow II (r. 590–628), after a vacancy of five years that followed the death of Qamishoʿ in 609. (Note: Samuel's ascension is placed either in 614, or 619.) As Samuel's ascension took place whilst the dyophysite Church of the East was leaderless due to Khosrow II's suppression of its patriarchate, it is suggested that Samuel wielded considerable power and may have been recognised as the spiritual leader of all Christians under the rule of the Sasanian Empire, which at that time included Roman territories occupied during the Roman–Sasanian War of 602–628.

Samuel entered into union with the Julianist Komitas Aghtsetsi, Catholicos of All Armenians, according to the Armenian Book of Letters, for which he may have later been repudiated and reflect his absence in textual sources. Sources suggest that Samuel had attempted to provide his future successor Marutha with an episcopal see but his offer was rejected, however, there is disagreement as to which see he had aimed to give the latter as the Life of Marutha records that Samuel offered to appoint Marutha as the bishop of Tikrit, whereas Bar Hebraeus' Ecclesiastical History purports that Samuel wanted to give Marutha his own office as Grand Metropolitan of the East.

In the Life of Marutha, Samuel receives veiled criticism for allowing dyophysites to celebrate the Eucharist with miaphysites. He served as Grand Metropolitan of the East until his death in 624 (AG 935). The historian Philip Wood argues that Samuel was not included in the Syriac Orthodox synaxarium as he may have collaborated with the Sasanian government during the Roman–Sasanian War of 602–628 in a manner that was later deemed unsuitable.

== Bibliography ==
- Barsoum, Aphrem (2009). The Collected Historical Essays of Aphram I Barsoum. Vol. 1. Translated by Matti Moosa. Gorgias Press.
- Ignatius Jacob III (2008). History of the Monastery of Saint Matthew in Mosul. Translated by Matti Moosa. Gorgias Press.
- Mazzola, Marianna, ed. (2018). Bar ‘Ebroyo’s Ecclesiastical History : writing Church History in the 13th century Middle East. PSL Research University.
- Wilmshurst, David (2019). "West Syrian patriarchs and maphrians". In Daniel King (ed.). The Syriac World. Routledge. pp. 806–813.
- Wood, Phillip John (2021). "Miaphysites in Iraq during the Last Great War of Antiquity (c. 604–28) and its Aftermath". The Journal of Ecclesiastical History: 1–18.

| Preceded by Qamishoʿ | Syriac Orthodox Grand Metropolitan of the East; 614–624 | Succeeded by Marutha |
