= Dinkha =

- Pronunciation: /dɪn.xɑ:/; Classical Syriac: [dɛn.ħɑ]
- Gender: Masculine

Origin
- Origin: Classical Syriac: ܕܢܚܐ (Dinkha)

Other names
- Alternative spelling: Denkha

Dinkha (Syriac: ܕܢܚܐ, romanized: dinḥā) also spelled Denkha, is a masculine name of Classical Syriac and Neo-Aramaic origin. It is predominantly used by ethnic Assyrians, who adhere to churches of the Syriac-rite.

Dinkha is originally a noun from both Classical Syriac and Assyrian Neo-Aramaic, which translates to "shine". The word can be inferred to as a shining light literally, or metaphorically as an epiphany/manifestation. It can be used as both a given name and a surname, and can also alternatively be used as Denha.

Persons with the name Dinkha as a given name or surname include:

- Michael Denkha, Iranian-Australian actor
- Dinkha IV, Patriarch of the Assyrian Church of the East
- Shimun XIII Dinkha, Patriarch of the Chaldean Catholic Church
- Shimun IX Dinkha, Patriarch of the Chaldean Catholic Church
