= 659 =

Calendar year

659 in various calendars
Gregorian calendar	659; DCLIX
Ab urbe condita	1412
Armenian calendar	108; ԹՎ ՃԸ
Assyrian calendar	5409
Balinese saka calendar	580–581
Bengali calendar	65–66
Berber calendar	1609
Buddhist calendar	1203
Burmese calendar	21
Byzantine calendar	6167–6168
Chinese calendar	戊午年 (Earth Horse); 3356 or 3149 — to — 己未年 (Earth Goat); 3357 or 3150
Coptic calendar	375–376
Discordian calendar	1825
Ethiopian calendar	651–652
Hebrew calendar	4419–4420
- Hindu calendars
Vikram Samvat	715–716
Shaka Samvat	580–581
Kali Yuga	3759–3760
Holocene calendar	10659
Iranian calendar	37–38
Islamic calendar	38–39
Japanese calendar	Hakuchi 10 (白雉１０年)
Javanese calendar	550–551
Julian calendar	659; DCLIX
Korean calendar	2992
Minguo calendar	1253 before ROC 民前1253年
Nanakshahi calendar	−809
Seleucid era	970/971 AG
Thai solar calendar	1201–1202
Tibetan calendar	ས་ཕོ་རྟ་ལོ་ (male Earth-Horse); 785 or 404 or −368 — to — ས་མོ་ལུག་ལོ་ (female Earth-Sheep); 786 or 405 or −367

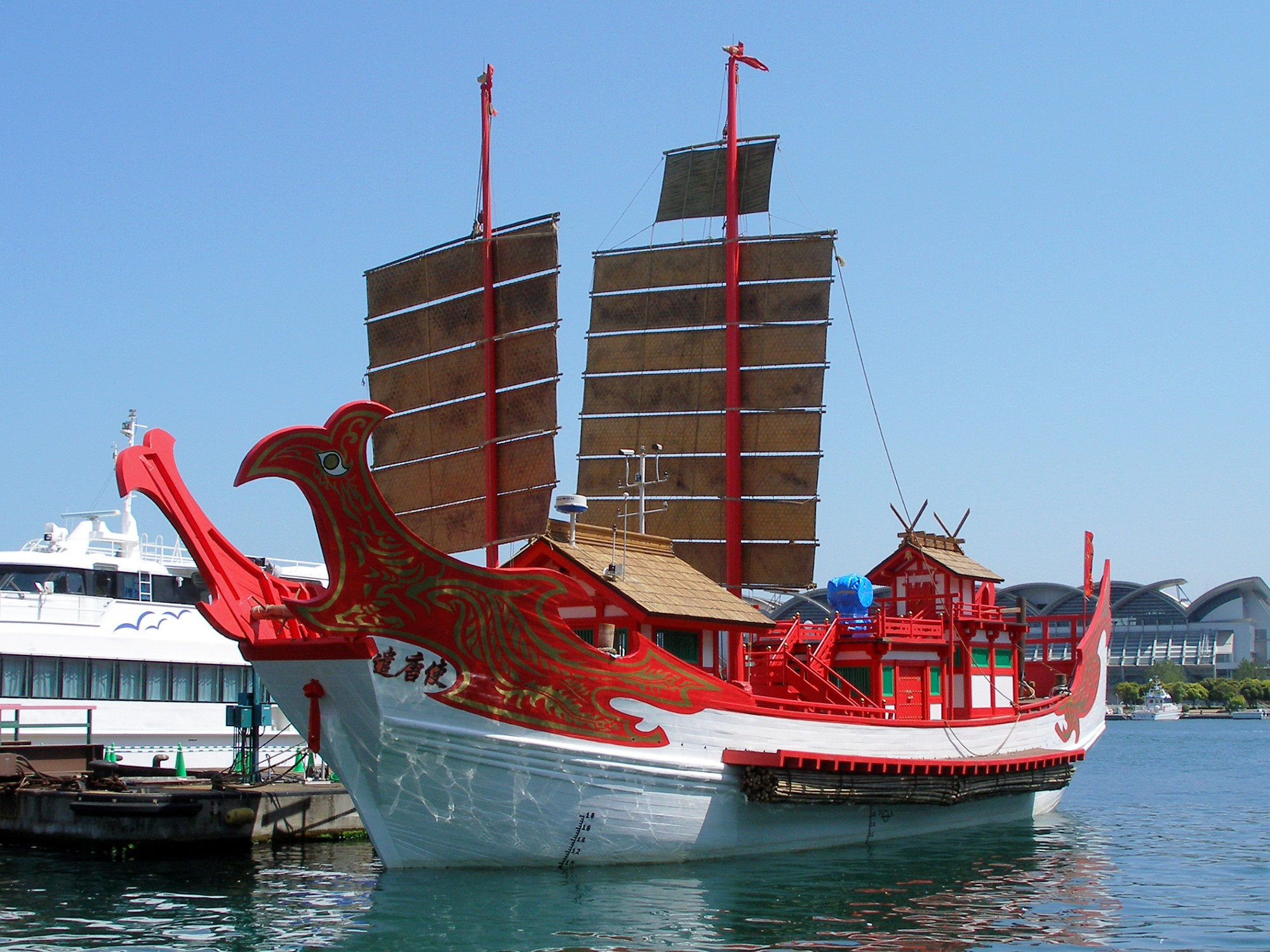
A Japanese mission ship in Hakata Bay (2010)

Year 659 (DCLIX) was a common year starting on Tuesday of the Julian calendar. The denomination 659 for this year has been used since the early medieval period, when the Anno Domini calendar era became the prevalent method in Europe for naming years.

== Events ==
=== By place ===
==== Byzantine Empire ====
- Arab–Byzantine War: Emperor Constans II signs a peace treaty with the Rashidun Caliphate. He uses the pause to strengthen his defences, and consolidates Byzantine control over Armenia. Constans establishes the themata, dividing territorial command in Anatolia.
- Constans II elevates his son Heraclius to the rank of co-emperor (Augustus), alongside his brother Tiberius.

==== Asia ====
- A Japanese embassy is sent to the Chinese Empire, and received in an audience by Emperor Gao Zong. The Tang dynasty is determined in the next year to take administrative measures in regard to Japan. The envoys are detained.

=== By topic ===
==== Religion ====
- March 17 – Gertrude of Nivelles, daughter of Pepin of Landen (mayor of the palace of Austrasia), requests on her deathbed a burial wearing a plain linen shroud. This is the traditional (pagan) practice of a 'furnished' grave.
- Leodegar, an opponent of Ebroin (mayor of the palace), is appointed bishop of Autun in Burgundy.

== Births ==
- Ali ibn Husayn Zayn, great-grandson of Muhammad and Shia Imam
- Cædwalla, king of Wessex (approximate date)
- Fujiwara no Fuhito, Japanese statesman (d. 720)
- He Zhizhang, Chinese poet (approximate date)

== Deaths ==
- March 17 – Gertrude of Nivelles, Frankish abbess (b. c.628)
- November 3 – Denha I of Tikrit, Syriac Orthodox Grand Metropolitan of the East.
- Bavo of Ghent, Frankish nobleman and saint (b. 622)
- Han Yuan, chancellor of the Tang dynasty (b. 606)
- Ishoyahb III, patriarch of the Church of the East
- Liu Shi, chancellor of the Tang dynasty
- Zhangsun Wuji, chancellor of the Tang dynasty
