= Church of Saint Ahudemmeh, Tikrit =

Syriac Orthodox church in Tikrit, Iraq

Church of Saint Ahudemmeh
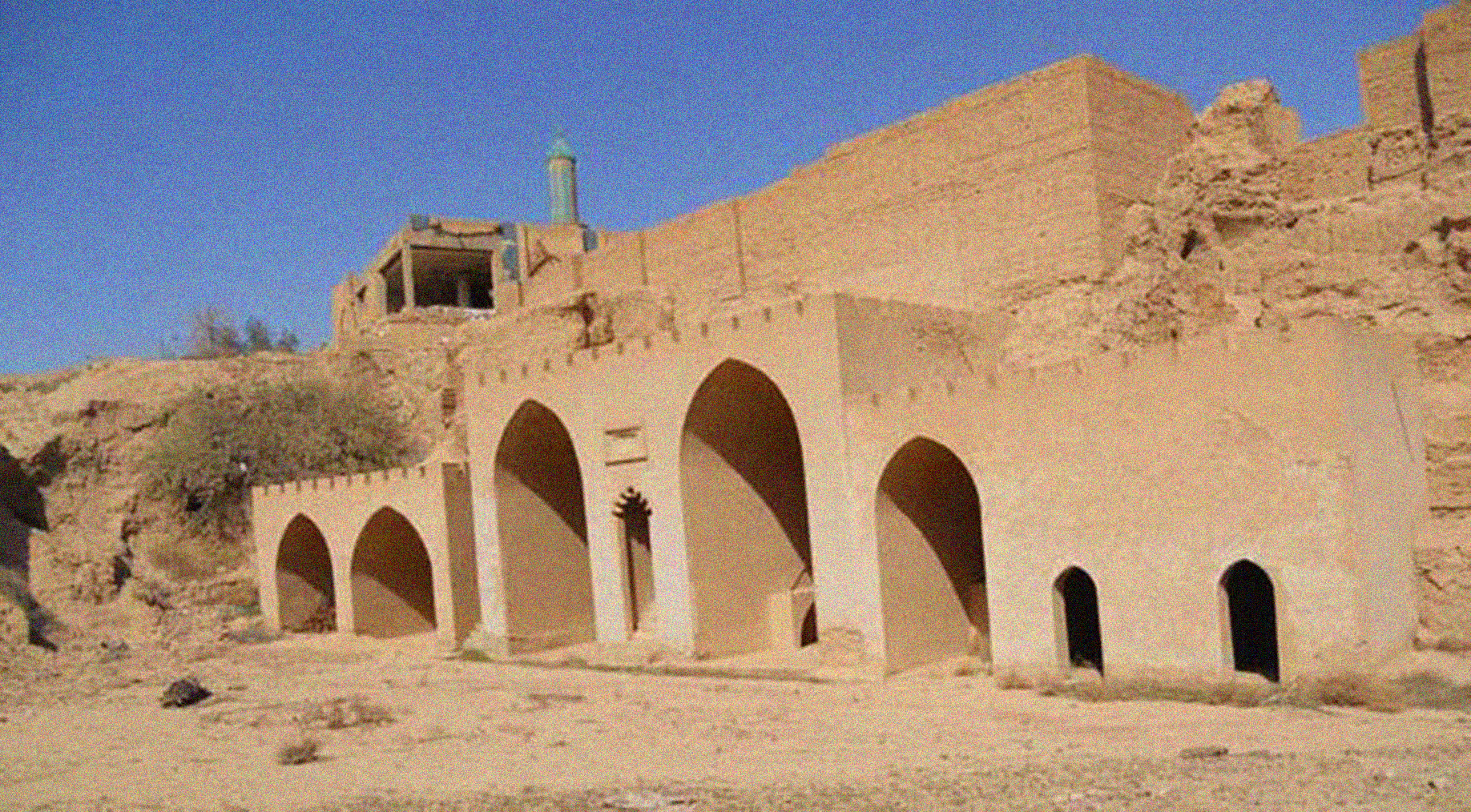
- Green Church in Tikrit

Religion
- Affiliation: Syriac Orthodox

Location
- Location: Tikrit, Iraq

Architecture
- Type: Church
- Completed: 700 AD

The Church of Saint Ahudemmeh, also known as the Green Church, was a Syriac Orthodox church in Tikrit, Iraq. The church was destroyed by Islamic State militants on 25 September 2014.

== History ==
The church was constructed by Denha II, Maphrian of the East, in 700 AD, and was dedicated to Saint Ahudemmeh. Denha II and his successors John II, Daniel, Thomas I, and Baselios III, were buried in the church. Dinkha of Tikrit debated theology and philosophy with Al-Masudi at the church in 925.

In 1089, the church was looted and destroyed by the governor of Tikrit, but was restored in 1112. Christians took refuge in the church during the Mongol invasion of Iraq in 1258, where they were slaughtered and few escaped.

The church was excavated by the Iraqi Archaeological Service in the 1990s, and several coffins were discovered, including that of Anaseous, Bishop of Tikrit. In 2000, Saddam Hussein had the church restored due to its dilapidated condition. On 25 September 2014, the church was destroyed by Islamic State militants with improvised explosive devices.

== Bibliography ==
- Rassam, Suha (2005). Christianity in Iraq: Its Origins and Development to the Present Day. Gracewing Publishing. ISBN 9780852446331.
