= Denha I of Tikrit =

Denha I
- Syriac Orthodox Grand Metropolitan of the East
- Church: Syriac Orthodox Church
- Installed: 649
- Term ended: 659
- Predecessor: Marutha
- Successor: Barishoʿ

Personal details
- Died: 3 November 659

Sainthood
- Feast day: 2 October
- Venerated in: Syriac Orthodox Church

Denha I (Syriac: ܕܢܚܐ ܩܕܡܝܐ ܡܦܪܝܢܐ ܕܬܓܪܝܬ, Arabic: دنحا الاول مفريان المشرق) was the Syriac Orthodox Grand Metropolitan of the East from 649 until his death in 659. He is commemorated as a saint by the Syriac Orthodox Church in the Martyrology of Rabban Sliba, and his feast day is 2 October.

== Biography ==
Denha became a monk at the monastery of Saint Matthew near Mosul and studied under Marutha, who would later ascend to the office of Grand Metropolitan of the East, the highest-ranking prelate amongst the miaphysite bishops in the former Sasanian Empire. After Marutha's death on 2 May 649 (AG 960), Denha was chosen to succeed him and was thus brought before the Patriarch Theodore and ordained as archbishop of Tikrit and Grand Metropolitan of the East. It was formerly asserted by the French orientalist Rubens Duval that Denha was the first miaphysite Grand Metropolitan of the East to hold the title maphrian, however, it was likely not in use until c. 1100. He served until his death on 3 November 659 (AG 970) and he was buried with Marutha at the cathedral in the citadel of Tikrit.

== Works ==
Denha wrote a hagiography of Marutha (Brit. Mus. MS. 14645), which was later translated by the French Syriacist François Nau.

== Bibliography ==
- Barsoum, Aphrem (2003). The Scattered Pearls: A History of Syriac Literature and Sciences. Translated by Matti Moosa (2nd ed.). Gorgias Press.
- Duval, Rubens (2013). Syriac Literature. Translated by Olivier Holmey. Gorgias Press.
- Fiey, Jean Maurice (2004). Lawrence Conrad (ed.). Saints Syriaques. The Darwin Press.
- Mazzola, Marianna, ed. (2018). Bar 'Ebroyo's Ecclesiastical History : writing Church History in the 13th century Middle East. PSL Research University.
- Nicholson, Oliver, ed. (2018). The Oxford Dictionary of Late Antiquity. Oxford University Press.
- Wilmshurst, David (2019). "West Syrian patriarchs and maphrians". In Daniel King (ed.). The Syriac World. Routledge. pp. 806–813.

Preceded by Marutha	Syriac Orthodox Grand Metropolitan of the East; 649–659	Succeeded by Barishoʿ
