= Ahudemmeh =

1st Maphrian of the East of Syriac Orthodox Church of Antioch

- Grand Metropolitan of the East
- Church: Syriac Orthodox Church
- Installed: 559
- Term ended: 575
- Predecessor: Office created
- Successor: Qamishoʿ

Personal details
- Born: Balad, Sassanian Empire
- Died: 2 August 575

Sainthood
- Feast day: 2 May, 2 June, 2 August
- Venerated in: Syriac Orthodox Church

Ahudemmeh was the Grand Metropolitan of the East in the Syriac Orthodox Church from 559 until his execution in 575. He was known as the Apostle of the Arabs, and is commemorated as a saint by the Syriac Orthodox Church. (Note: Alternatively transliterated as Ahoudemmeh ("he who resembles his mother" in Syriac). (Arabic: مار احودامه; Syriac: ܐܚܘܕܐܡܗ))

== Biography ==
=== Early life ===
Ahudemmeh was born at Balad, northwest of Mosul and then part of the Sasanian Empire, to a dyophysite family, but became a non-Chalcedonian miaphysite upon reaching maturity and later became a monk. It was previously asserted that he was the bishop of Nineveh of the same name that had attended the synod of the dyophysite Patriarch Joseph of Seleucia-Ctesiphon in 554, but this has since been refuted. At some point, according to the Ecclesiastical History of John of Ephesus, Ahudemmeh and a number of bishops and priests were engaged in a dispute with Joseph and eventually a formal disputation was arranged by Shahanshah Khosrow I, who was to act as arbiter. The dispute may have resulted either from theological or personal differences. Ahudemmeh led his faction in the debate and argued in favour of miaphysitism, for which Khosrow deemed him to be the victor and granted freedom of worship and permission to build churches.

=== Grand Metropolitan of the East ===
In 559 (AG 870), he was ordained as bishop of Beth Arbaye and Grand Metropolitan of the East by a fellow miaphysite, Jacob Baradaeus, bishop of Edessa. Catholicos Christopher I of Armenia is attested to have ordained Ahudemmeh as bishop of Beth Arbaye by Bar Hebraeus in his Ecclesiastical History, however, this has since been disregarded due to the argument of François Nau. It is suggested that he may have already established himself at Tikrit by this time. Ahudemmeh's ordination as Grand Metropolitan of the East thereby cemented the schism within the Church of the East and established a separate miaphysite ecclesiastical organisation, later known as the Syriac Orthodox Church of the East, in opposition to the dyophysites, who remained the majority amongst Christians in the Sasanian Empire.

He then set about preaching miaphysite Christianity in the region of Beth Arbaye, which stretched from Tikrit in the south to Nisibis in the north, bound in the west by the Khabur and the Tigris in the east, and was inhabited by Arab tribes, the Tanukh, Banu Uqayl, and Tayy. Ahudemmeh travelled amongst the Arabs, during which time he is credited with a number of miracles, including the exorcism of a sheikh's daughter, expulsion of demons from places of worship, purification of lepers, and curing the sick. At the encampments of the nomadic Arabs, Ahudemmeh preached Christianity, performed baptisms, consecrated a priest and deacon for each community, and established churches named after clan leaders, thus encouraging their participation and leadership.

Ahudemmeh also constructed a monastery of Saint Sergius at ‘Ain Qena, in which he deposited some relics, and another monastery at Ga‘tani, near Qronta, a village opposite Tikrit. The monastery of Saint Sergius was built in imitation of the church of Saint Sergius at Resafa in Roman Syria with the intention of attracting Arab pilgrims away from the latter and offered support for travellers and the poor. It was identified as the ruins of Qasr Sarij, near Balad, by Jean Maurice Fiey in 1956, and its construction placed in 565 by David Oates. Ignatius Jacob III alternatively gives 570 as the year of the monastery's construction. Dyophysites set the monastery of Saint Sergius aflame, but it was rebuilt and restored by Khosrow.

=== Later life ===
He continued his missionary work amongst the Magi at Tikrit and converted a son of Khosrow, who adopted the name George upon his baptism by Ahudemmeh. For this, Ahudemmeh was imprisoned and eventually beheaded on Khosrow's orders on 2 August 575 (AG 886). His body was retrieved and moved to the monastery near Qronta by one of its monks and some of his relics were also later taken to a church dedicated to him at Tikrit. He was commemorated in a hagiography by an unknown author.

== Works ==
Ahudemmeh is identified as the author of the same name of several philosophical works, including treatises on the definitions of logic, fate and predestination, the soul, man as a microcosm, and the composition of man’s body and soul. He is also credited with a Syriac grammatical text, which was based on Greek grammar, attested by the monk John bar Zoʿbi at the end of the twelfth century and beginning of the thirteenth. However, the British scholar Sebastian Brock argues against this identification and suggests the authors of the philosophical and grammatical works to be separate individuals of merely the same name.

== Bibliography ==
- Barsoum, Aphrem (2003). The Scattered Pearls: A History of Syriac Literature and Sciences. Translated by Matti Moosa (2nd ed.). Gorgias Press.
- Brock, Sebastian P. (2011a). "Aḥudemmeh". In Sebastian P. Brock; Aaron M. Butts; George A. Kiraz; Lucas Van Rompay (eds.). Gorgias Encyclopedic Dictionary of the Syriac Heritage: Electronic Edition. Beth Mardutho. p. 13.
- Brock, Sebastian P. (2011b). "Aḥudemmeh of Balad". In Sebastian P. Brock; Aaron M. Butts; George A. Kiraz; Lucas Van Rompay (eds.). Gorgias Encyclopedic Dictionary of the Syriac Heritage: Electronic Edition. Beth Mardutho. p. 13.
- Duval, Rubens (2013). Syriac Literature. Translated by Olivier Holmey. Gorgias Press.
- Fiey, Jean Maurice (2004). Lawrence Conrad (ed.). Saints Syriaques (in French). The Darwin Press.
- Fowden, Elizabeth Key (1999). The Barbarian Plain: Saint Sergius Between Rome and Iran. University of California Press.
- Ignatius Jacob III (2008). History of the Monastery of Saint Matthew in Mosul. Translated by Matti Moosa. Gorgias Press.
- Mazzola, Marianna, ed. (2018). Bar 'Ebroyo's Ecclesiastical History : writing Church History in the 13th century Middle East. PSL Research University.
- Nicholson, Oliver, ed. (2018). The Oxford Dictionary of Late Antiquity. Oxford University Press.
- Oates, David (2005). Studies in the Ancient History of Northern Iraq (PDF) (Second ed.). Oxford University Press.

Preceded by Office created	Syriac Orthodox Grand Metropolitan of the East; 559–575	Succeeded by Qamishoʿ
