= Barhebraeus =

Scholar, polymath, and primate of the Syriac Orthodox Church of Antioch (1226–1286)

Mār Gregory Barhebraeus
- ܓܪܝܓܘܪܝܘܣ ܒܪ ܥܒܪܝܐ
- Barhebraeus absorbed in study
- Born: 1226 ʿEbra, near Malatya, Sultanate of Rûm (modern-day Elazığ, Turkey)
- Died: 30 July, 1286 (aged 59–60); Maragha, Persia

Philosophical work
- Era: Medieval era
- Region: Christian theology, Western philosophy
- School: Syriac Christianity
- Main interests: Christian theology, logic, metaphysics, medicine, history
- Maphrian (Catholicos of the East)
- Church: Syriac Orthodox Church
- Diocese: Tagrit
- See: Antioch
- In office: 1264–1286
- Predecessor: Ignatius Sleeba III
- Successor: Gregory Barsauma

Orders
- Ordination: 1264 by Ignatius IV Yeshu
- Rank: Maphrian

Personal details
- Born: 1226 Melitene, Sultanate of Rûm
- Died: 30 July 1286 (aged 59–60) Maragha, Persia

Sainthood
- Feast day: 30 July
- Venerated in: Oriental Orthodox Church, especially Syriac Orthodox Church
- Shrines: Mor Mattai Monastery

Gregory Barhebraeus or Bar Hebraeus (Syriac: ܓܪܝܓܘܪܝܘܣ ܒܪ ܥܒܪܝܐ, romanised: Grīgōrīyōs bar ʿEbrāyā; 1226 – 30 July 1286), also known as Abu al-Faraj and in Latin, Abulpharagius, was the maphrian Catholicos of the East (regional primate) of the Catholicate of the East under the Syriac Orthodox Church from 1264 until his death in 1286. He is recognised as one of the most accomplished and multifaceted academics of the medieval Syriac Christian world, with important contributions to the fields of theology, philosophy, history, linguistics, medicine, and the natural sciences.

Barhebraeus was born in Melitene (modern-day Malatya) during the Seljuk Sultanate of Rum. He experienced the shifting borders of the early Mongol era, Ayyubid rule, and Crusader dominions. Barhebraeus's early education in medicine and logic was influenced by his father Aaron's experience serving in the upper echelons of the Mongol armies as a physician and deacon. Later in life, he was ordained bishop and soon elevated to maphrian, under which he travelled across the Middle East, engaged in scholarship, and sought to support his community through the difficult 13th-century period.

The monumental chronicle, a universal history written in Syriac and translated into Arabic under the title Tārīkh Mukhtaṣar al-Duwal, was part of Barhebraeus's vast body of work. In addition, he produced important theological and ascetic treatises, medical books, grammars, and encyclopaedic works like the "Cream of Wisdom" (Hewath Hekhemtho). Barhebraeus's writings were read by a wide range of intellectual circles outside of his Syriac Orthodox community, including Christians of different denominations, Muslim scholars, Latin orientalists, and later found in academic archives in Europe.

The immense scholarship brought forth by Barhebraeus revitalised Syriac literature at a time when it was in decline and bridged Christian, Islamic, and classical traditions, which earned him epithets such as the "Ocean of Wisdom", "Light of East and West", and "King of Learned Men". He is commemorated with great honour as a saint in the Oriental Orthodox Churches and especially in the Syriac Orthodox tradition where his feast is celebrated on 30 July, the date of his repose, and his relics at Mor Mattai Monastery remain a popular pilgrimage site.

== Name ==
The name Barhebraeus (Syriac: ܒܪ ܥܒܪܝܐ, romanised: Bar ʿEbrāyā) literally means 'Son of the Hebrew', and although the phrase might suggest Jewish ancestry, this interpretation is almost unanimously rejected by modern scholars. There is no evidence of Jewish elements in his writings and his family background was Christian, noble, and clerical; his father, Aaron, was a deacon—whose name, despite its Hebrew origin, was common among Christians of the region and period.

Barhebraeus himself addressed the misunderstanding in a short epigram:

If the Lord called himself a Samaritan, do not be ashamed when they call you Bar ʿEbrāyā. For the name has to do with the Euphrates and with the river, not with the false religion or with the language.

Patriarch Ignatius Aphrem I Barsoum interpreted the epithet as originating from the circumstances of his birth, that his mother gave birth to him while crossing the Euphrates, the Syriac word ʿbar also meaning 'crossing'. Modern scholars, however, associate it with a village named ʿEbra (modern-day Elazığ) near Melitene, situated on the banks of the Euphrates River.

His Arabic name Abu'l-Faraj appears in his own usage for the first time on the eve of his episcopal ordination, which means that Gregory (Grigorios) was his episcopal name, while Abu'l-Faraj was his earlier personal designation.

E. W. Budge states that Barhebraeus was given the baptismal name John (Syriac: ܝܘܚܢܢ, romanised: Yōḥanān), but modern scholarship suggests that this might be the result of confusion with Gregory John of Bartelli. Still, the inscription on his grave at Mor Mattai Monastery reads: "This is the grave of Mar Gregory John, and of Mar Bar Sawma, his brother, the children of the Hebrew [plural of Bar ʿEbrāyā] on Mount Elpeph".

== Life ==
=== Early life ===
Barhebraeus was born in 1225 or 1226 AD under the rule of the Rum Seljuks and lived through a succession of regimes including the Crusaders, the Ayyubids, and later the Mongols. He was a native of Melitene (modern-day Malatya), then a major metropolitan and cultural centre of the Syriac Orthodox Church.

His father, Aaron (Arabic: هارون بن توما الملطي, romanised: Hārūn bin Tūmā al-Malaṭī) was both a deacon and a renowned physician, known to have treated the Mongol general Yasaʾur during the siege of Melitene. This profession placed the family among the patrician class, to which his mother also belonged. He had at least one brother Safi (often called Barsauma) and probably three more named Michael, Muwaffaq, and Quphar. Barsauma's monastic name was later changed to Gregory upon ordination.

The family remained in Melitene until 1242–1243. After Aaron's medical service to Yasaʾur, they moved to Antioch, where Barhebraeus continued his studies, and at around seventeen years of age, he became a monk and began to live as a hermit upon ordination by Patriarch Ignatius III David. Influenced by his father, Barhebraeus left Antioch and travelled to Tripoli, a Crusader state at the time, to begin his study of medicine alongside Saliba bar Jacob Wajih of Edessa—the future Maphrian Ignatius IV (1253–1258). His expertise eventually secured him the position of personal physician to Hulagu Khan, which was a remarkable achievement. He later undertook practical training in Damascus under Jamal al-Din ibn al-Rahbi al-Dimashqi at the Nur al-Din Hospital.

=== Episcopate ===
Barhebraeus was first ordained bishop of Gubbos by Patriarch Ignatius David III, and soon after transferred to Laqabin, both near Melitene, where he was ordained maphrian. He supported Dionysius VII ʿAngur (r. 1252–1261) in his conflict with John XIII bar Maʿdani (r. maphrian 1232–1252; r. patriarch 1252–1263). As a reward, Dionysius appointed him bishop of Aleppo. His tenure was short-lived, however, as his former colleague Saliba bar Jacob Wajih (now Maphrian Ignatius IV) sided with John bar Maʿdani and succeeded in having him expelled. Barhebraeus briefly resided with his father in Aleppo, then moved to Mar Barsawma Monastery, where Dionysius resided. In 1258 he travelled to Damascus to secure reinstatement for himself and Dionysius, aided by the Melitene-born physician Qir Michael bar Gabras. He was present in Aleppo in January 1260 when the Mongols invaded; his attempt to spare his people, in vain, led to temporary detainment in Qalʿat al-Najm. He was eventually released and reconciled with John bar Maʿdani.

Unlike earlier maphrians who had resided in the Levant to escape persecution, thereby neglecting their home dioceses, Barhebraeus chose to live among his flock in Tagrit and at times in the nearby Monastery of Mor Mattai, even amidst the violent persecutions under the Mongols and Mamluks in the thirteenth century.

From 1260 to 1264 Barhebraeus served at the Mongol court as personal physician to Hulagu Khan before being elected maphrian by Ignatius IV at Sis in Cilicia on 19/20 January 1264. The ceremony was grand, attended by King Hethum II, his brothers and sons, Armenian high priests, and dignitaries from many nations and faiths, along with a large assembly of Syriac Orthodox bishops and laymen. Afterwards, he travelled widely throughout Mesopotamia and Iranian Azerbaijan, particularly between Nineveh (where he probably stayed at Mor Mattai Monastery) and the cities of Tabriz and Maragha, centres of the Ilkhanid court and learning.

=== Death ===
Barhebraeus wrote in one poem: "O' net of the world, in 1226 your trap caught me, and I think in 1286 I will not be in you". In 1286, he travelled to Tabriz and completed an Arabic translation of the Syriac work The Political History of the World within thirty days.

Soon after, in Maragha, he fell ill with a fever two days before his death and, as he predicted, died on the night of Tuesday, 30 July, 1286, in the presence of his brother Barsauma and many others. A grand funeral was held in Maragha, and Catholicos Yahballaha III (1282–1317) of the Church of the East declared a public day of mourning attended by Christians of various denominations. His remains were interred beneath an altar in the Maragha church and later translated to Mor Mattai Monastery, where they are kept today alongside his brother's.

==== Legacy ====
He was ordained monk in 1244, bishop in 1246 (taking the name Gregory), and maphrian on 19 January 1264. He founded two churches, two monasteries, two episcopal residences, and a guesthouse for travellers. During his tenure, he consecrated twelve bishops, including his biographer and disciple Dioscorus of Gozarto and Philoxenus I Nemrud (later Patriarch, 1283–1292), respectively.

One of the most distinguished holders of the title of Maphrian was Barhebraeus. He spent most of his life, including all his later years, within Mongol territory until his death in 1286. While based mainly in Nineveh and the environs of Mosul and Mor Mattai Monastery, he maintained friendships with scholars of diverse faiths and frequently travelled to major learning centres, most importantly Maragha in Iranian Azerbaijan, then-capital of the Mongol khanate. His close ties with Mongols and other communities enabled him to provide detailed first‑hand accounts, which is why the events of the 13th century are so well documented in both his secular and ecclesiastical chronicles.

Barhebraeus also highlights the crucial part Syriac scholars played in bringing Greek philosophy to the Arab world in his reflections on intellectual history. He places Syriac scholarship as an important bridge in the larger evolution of medieval intellectual culture, attributing the medieval Arab interest in philosophy and the sciences to the translation efforts of earlier Syriac writers.

== Writings ==
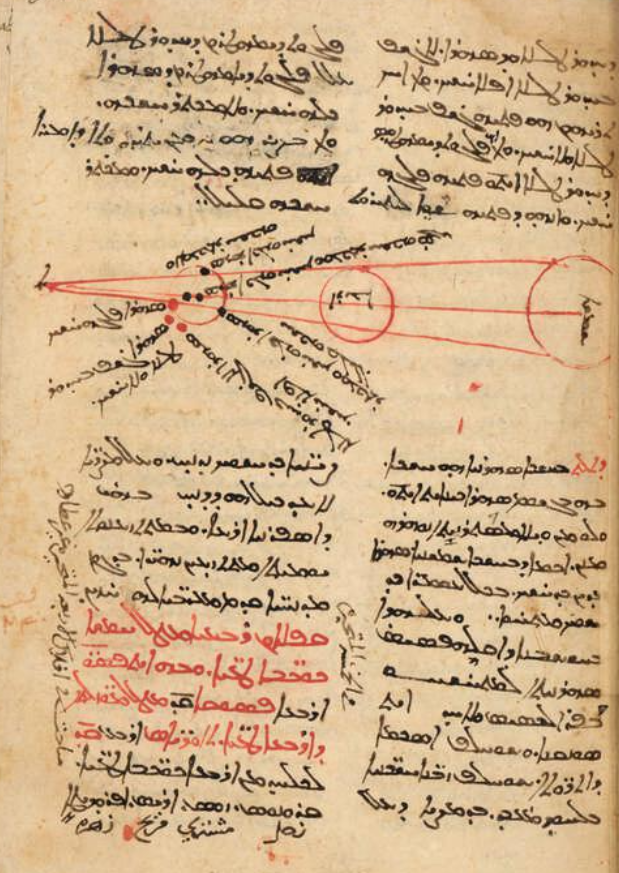
A page from a copy of the Hewath Hekhemtho, 1340

Barhebraeus was among the most prolific writers of the Middle Ages, with his surviving corpus being vast and diverse, spanning theology, philosophy, history, medicine, grammar, astronomy, and the natural sciences. His brother Barsauma reports a total of 31 works by him, though his disciple Dioscorus of Gozarto and various manuscripts have variations on this total. His writings were so extensive and refined that J. S. Assemani called them "easily the chief of the writings of the Jacobites" and J. P. Martin described him as "one of the most prolific writers to have ever emerged". Jean Maurice Fiey said that while Barhebraeus was "often just a populariser", he was a "genius populariser, and one can only admire the amount of work he has produced, especially when considering the often difficult circumstances in which he had to operate".

Barhebraeus's corpus reflects the full breadth of intellectual traditions available in his time. Göttsberger compared him with Ephrem the Syrian and Jacob of Edessa as the third great pillar of Syriac intellectual history—Ephrem representing pure Syriac thought, Jacob Greek influence, and Barhebraeus the synthesis of Arabic and Islamic science and philosophy. His works display familiarity with Islamic scholarship by drawing from Ibn Sina, al-Ghazali, and al-Abhari.

Barhebraeus's writings circulated widely. They were found in virtually every Syriac-speaking region to the extent that any single library might contain up to 10 per cent of its manuscripts authored by him. His writings were translated into Arabic and cited as a major authority. They were read across confessional line by the Church of the East, the Maronites, the Coptic Orthodox, and the Melkites; they were read even by Muslims, especially his medical works. His texts also reached Europe where early Orientalists and Syriacists studied them extensively.

Barhebraeus's works largely consist of compendia that synthesise material from older Syriac and more recent Arabo‑Persian literature. He was previously castigated as a skilful but unoriginal compiler of earlier works, but that judgement is misplaced, as his originality lies in his choice of sources and his openness to knowledge found in Islamic and non‑Orthodox texts. His writings remained standard across Syriac Christianity including its Eastern, Western and Maronite branches. They were translated into Arabic mainly by Daniel of Mardin (1326/27 – after 1382) and Grigorios Yuhanna bin al-Ghurayr al-Zurbabi (bishop of Damascus, 1668–1684).

=== Chronicle ===
Barhebraeus's most celebrated work is his chronicle (Syriac: ܡܟܬܒܢܘܬ ܙܒܢܐ, romanised: Maḫṯabānuṯ Zabnê, lit. 'History of Times'), the largest piece of classical Syriac historiography ever written, no later work surpassing it in scale. The chronicle consists of two complementary parts, a Universal History and an Ecclesiastical History. The Universal History (also known as the Chronicon Syriacum) covers world events from Creation to Barhebraeus's own era and was translated into Arabic as Tārīkh Mukhtaṣar al-Duwal, adapted for a Muslim audience. His brother Barsauma addended it to 1297, while priest Addai of Basibrina continued the Ecclesiastical History to 1496. It runs from Creation to his death in 1286. Though intended to instruct "his people" (the Syriac Orthodox), Barhebraeus knew it would reach a wide readership, which is why he supplemented the work with material of general interest while retaining scholarly sense for specialists.

The chronicle is divided into eleven dynastic sections (yubbālē), following the model of the Book of Daniel, with the final section devoted to the contemporary Mongols (whom Barhebraeus calls 'Huns'). The second part was translated into Latin in 1789 by Paul Jakob Bruns and Georg Wilhelm Kirsch, and a superior edition was produced by Paul Bedjan in 1890 from the Syriac. Budge published an English translation in 1932 based on Bedjan's French with a facsimile of the Syriac original from the Bodleian Library. Although the secular sections were extensively used by medieval historians, neither part has been the subject of major analysis.

It treats history, religion, language, and the customs of peoples; includes biographies of notable warriors and physicians; describes battles, sieges and the capture of cities; records comets and other unusual celestial phenomena; and notes earthquakes, famines, heavy snowfall, and the freezing of the Tigris and Euphrates, with the associated food prices in times of scarcity. He also recounts court scandals, repeats various rumours, and relates 'laughable stories'.

Structurally, Barhebraeus adopts and innovates upon the chronological tables of earlier historians like Eusebius of Caesarea and Michael the Syrian, replacing them with successions of rulers and patriarchs, with expansions to incorporate Muslim, Persian and Armenian sources while diminishing the Byzantine focus and reflecting the multicultural milieu of the thirteenth century. This arrangement separated secular and ecclesiastical history, preventing the reader from easily associating secular events with their corresponding ecclesiastical ones and forcing them to cross‑reference manually or rely on memory. Early sections begin with "After such-and-such, another such-and-such", but it later changes, becoming "After the persecution of the orthodox [i.e., Miaphysites] of the East, Ahudhemmeh became the Metropolitan of the East".

Within the ecclesiastical portion, the lemmata for Jewish hierarchs begin with Aaron (not Moses, since Aaron was the true priest), followed by his son Phinehas, and continue through to Caiaphas and Annas. After this, the old high‑priesthood 'disappeared' and was superseded by Jesus Christ's, with Peter as the new hierarch. Afterwards, he traces the patriarchs of Alexandria, Constantinople, Jerusalem, Ephesus, and Antioch, and then continues only as Antioch, since his "eastern lands are subject to the authority of the throne of Antioch".

Barhebraeus records various Church Fathers, such as Athanasius of Alexandria and Ephrem the Syrian, in addition to heretical figures in his Church, like Arius and Apollinaris. He discusses the Chalcedonian schism, noting that Justin deposed Severus of Antioch using military force and that his successor, the 'excellent' Sergius of Tella, was ordained by John of Anazarbus (in fact, Jacob Baradeus performed the ordination). He mentions Jacob Baradeus's efforts across the East to preserve the Syriac Orthodox hierarchy by ordaining many bishops, which led to the Church bearing his name. The list of patriarchs continues to Barhebraeus's time with addenda by anonymous authors.

The apostolic foundation by Thomas, Addai, Aggai, Mari, and Abrosius is described in the Ecclesiastical History's 'Eastern' section, where the evangelism of Thomas, the 'high priest of the East', and the translation of his relics to Edessa, are described. Barhebraeus then discusses the line of Church of the East patriarchs with notable ecumenical sympathy; still, he views the maphrianate of the Syriac Orthodox in the East as the rightful continuation of the ancient see of Seleucia-Ctesiphon, where the ecclesiastical succession of that see, following Isho'yabh, continues through Syriac Orthodox maphrians, culminating with Barhebraeus himself. The lineage extends through his brother, Barsauma, whose pontificate was documented by an anonymous author writing after his time.

==== Arabic version ====
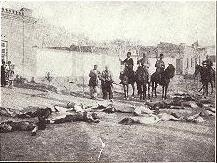
The persecution of Assyrian Christians in Mesopotamia has been rampant throughout history, peaking with the Seyfo genocide in 1915; ongoing oppression continues to affect this community

Barhebraeus's Chronicon Syriacum was purposefully modified for Arabic in Tārīkh Mukhtaṣar al-Duwal to suit his target audience. For instance, he omitted accounts of Arab persecutions, softened Christian-Mongol connections, used the Hijri calendar exclusively, and replaced overtly Christian expressions with inclusive wording. Both the Syriac and Arabic versions exhibit linguistic and ideological variations that signify Barhebraeus's purpose to tailor the work for different audiences, as the Arabic version carefully adjusts the text to accommodate Muslim ears.

A more accurate translation of the Arabic recension would be "The Abridged Histories of the States or Empires", although many contemporary scholars have translated this as "The Abridged History of the Dynasties". This is because the Arabic word al-duwal (plural of dawla) literally means 'states' or 'political powers', while Barhebraeus frequently used ansāb to refer to 'dynasties'. An 18th-century Latin translation that used the word dynastiarum to convey the idea of political succession is probably what gave rise to the popular translation 'dynasties'.

Though their emphases differ, the sources underpinning both texts are essentially the same. The chronicle of Michael the Syrian, East-Syriac historical writings, various Arabic and Persian material—particularly Juvayni's Tārīkh-i Jahāngushāy, which Barhebraeus probably encountered while at Maragha—and potential Armenian sources constitute the primary sources of inspiration.

In descriptions of the terminology employed, the Syriac edition applies the title 'Caliph' to multiple Muslim rulers, including the Fatimids, while the Arabic work reserves this title exclusively for the Abbasid Caliph, aligning with mainstream Islamic convention of Barhebraeus's time and region. Omitted are accounts describing the persecution of Christians at Tagrit by Arab forces and details regarding Christians taking refuge in a church before their liberation by two Armenians. Additionally omitted is the use of explicitly Christian formulations like referring to Hulagu's wife as "the believing queen and lover of Christ", and all uses of the Greek calendar.

Further on, the Arabic chronicle also shortens or softens depictions of Muslim aggression toward Christians, such as by condensing passages describing the plundering of the Monastery of the Sisters of Beth Kūdida, the months-long siege of Mor Mattai Monastery by Kurds with looting of the monastery's valuables by them and their altercations with the monks, the murder of Christians at the Habsusyotho monastery, and the killing of ʿAlam al-Din Sanjar and his Kurdish allies.

Both versions praise Hulagu's successor Kublai Khan, but the Arabic version omits the phrase "lover of Christians" in favour of "lover of all religious people from all confessions and nations", with various descriptions admiring the Mongol rulers. Additionally, in further demonstration of the good relations between Christians and Mongols, the Arabic text excises a passage about a Syriac priest rising to a high-ranking position as a physician in Hulagu's palace.

While both recount stories of Crusaders in the Middle East, the Arabic version specifies the Crusaders as "Franks", while the Syriac version refers to everyone as "Christians" regardless of denomination or political position.

=== Theology ===
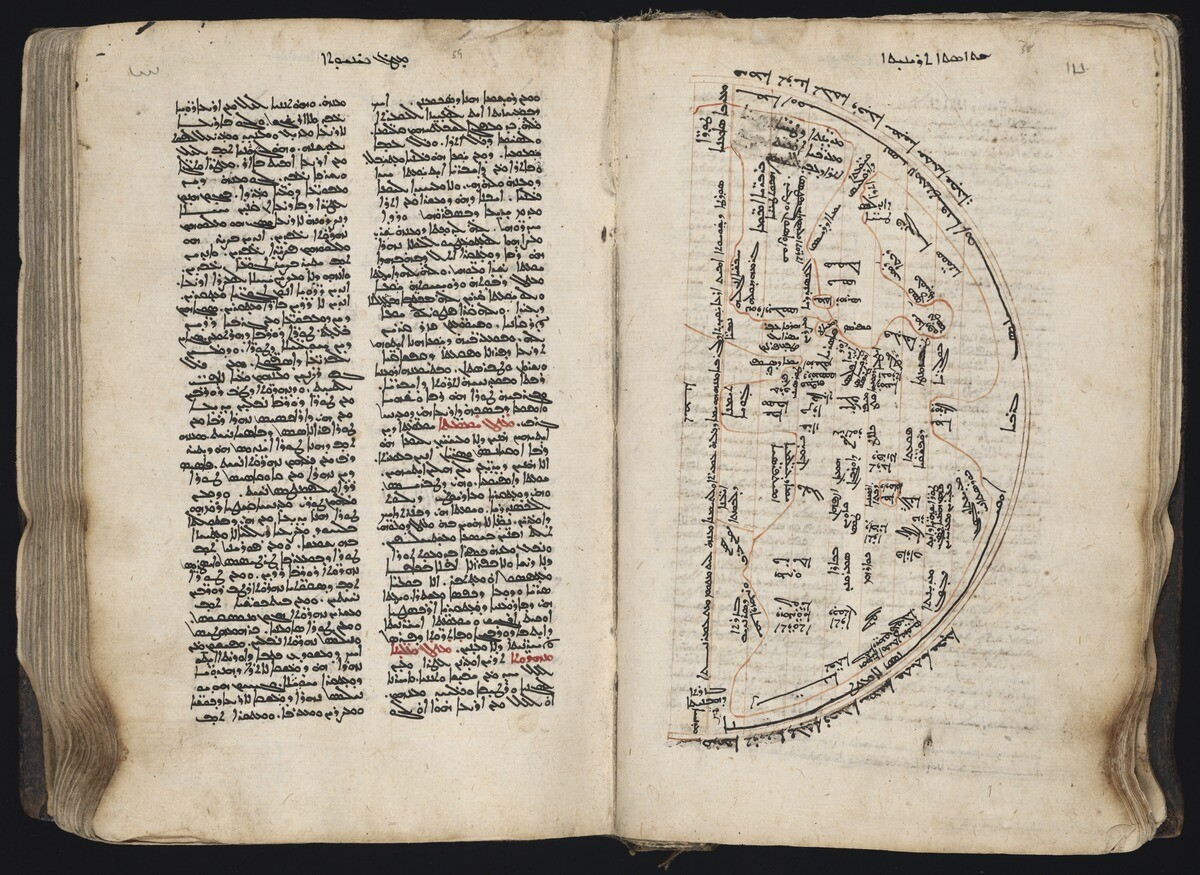
Syriac MS 7 by Barhebraeus from "The Lamp of the Sanctuaries" (Mnorath Qudshe), a theological work; the damaged right page (likely from candlelight) depicts a semicircular world map

Barhebraeus remained steadfast in his adherence to Miaphysite Christology even as he adopted an approach characterised by intellectual openness and ecumenical awareness. In his large theological summa, he devotes several sections to Christology. He offers an explanation and a refutation of the Dyophysite doctrine and its arguments, but does not mention the Crusaders in that context. In some passages, he treats these theological differences as substantive rather than merely semantic; for example, he reproaches a bishop who dismissed a Nestorian's theological objections as sophistry and supplies the responses the bishop should have given. The book ends with a list of thirty heresies, most of which are Christological in nature, but it noticeably leaves out the Chalcedonians (including the Latins) and Nestorians, categorising their differences as mainly terminological rather than substantive. This contrasts with the preceding chapter where Miaphysitism is strongly affirmed, but aligns with his other works that display an open ecumenical attitude, including those that place less emphasis on dogma and more on spiritual matters.

Among Barhebraeus's theological works are the "Book of the Dove", which emphasises ascetic living, and the Ethikon, which provides monks, priests and laypeople with moral and spiritual guidance. In the Ethikon, he cautions against disputation as verbal cunning intended to subdue an adversary lest it causes one to sin, and counsels ascetics to abstain from speculative discussions about "natures and persons", referring to Christological debates.

A page from "The Book of the Dove" (Kthobo d-Yawno), detailing monastic life and is an important work of mystical theology

Barhebraeus has been described as a "supporter of the validity of a certain theological pluralism". Using the framework of Greek patristic and philosophical thought, Barhebraeus discussed traditional Christological issues in his theological correspondence with Catholicos Denha I. Notwithstanding their differences in doctrine, Barhebraeus urged Denha to look beyond the rifts that had long divided their churches as a result of the disputes between Nestorius and Cyril. His historical writings draw heavily on the East‑Syrian Chronicle tradition, which demonstrates his willingness to engage with traditions outside his own communion and his scholarly respect for them.

Scholars differ in interpreting the motivation behind Barhebraeus's ecumenical outlook. Herman Teule considers it a sincere expression of theological fraternity and genuine openness toward other Christian denominations; on the other hand, Hidemi Takahashi sees it as pragmatic to a degree and meant to improve the Christian community's social and political standing during Mongol rule—though not devoid of genuine elements of goodwill and conciliation.

Barhebraeus's works, while rooted in the Syriac literary and poetic tradition, also show a significant interest in Greek philosophy, especially Aristotle's ideas. This synthesis is most clearly reflected in his encyclopaedic work "The Cream of Wisdom" (Hewath Hekhmetho).

=== Medicine ===
Barhebraeus's initial path in life appears to have been set toward medicine rather than theology. He was remembered as first "the father of physicians" and then "the glory of pastors" in a manuscript colophon, showing the dual nature of his vocation but emphasising his role as a healer. The fact that his father was a Mongol general's personal physician probably contributed to his early academic direction. Barhebraeus himself pursued formal studies in 'medicine and logic' under a Nestorian teacher in Tripoli, and later worked with the physician Jamal al-Din in Damascus. By 1263, records place him working within Mongol military camps alongside other physicians. Barhebraeus remained steadfast in his commitment to the medical sciences even after being promoted to the high ecclesiastical office of maphrian, in an effort to pass on medical knowledge to future generations.

Eight works on medicine and pharmacology are known to be by him. These treatises, which avoid the elaborate or poetic style that permeates much of his literary output, have simple, descriptive titles, in contrast with many of his other works with more ornate titles. Four of these works were written in Arabic and the rest in Syriac.

Barhebraeus held that the medical profession offered Christians a means of attaining influence and respect within the largely Muslim society of his day, and perhaps this motivated him to compose and disseminate his medical works among Syriac Christians. Nevertheless, his writings were not intended solely for that community; Barhebraeus records using the Hijri dating system himself and composed some works in Arabic at the request of Muslims (ṭayyāyē) in Maragha, while his openings include an Islamic basmala with references to Christian Apostles phrased so as to suit a Muslim audience. Thus, Barhebraeus's works transcend the needs of a single religious community in favour of the greater good.

=== Astronomy ===
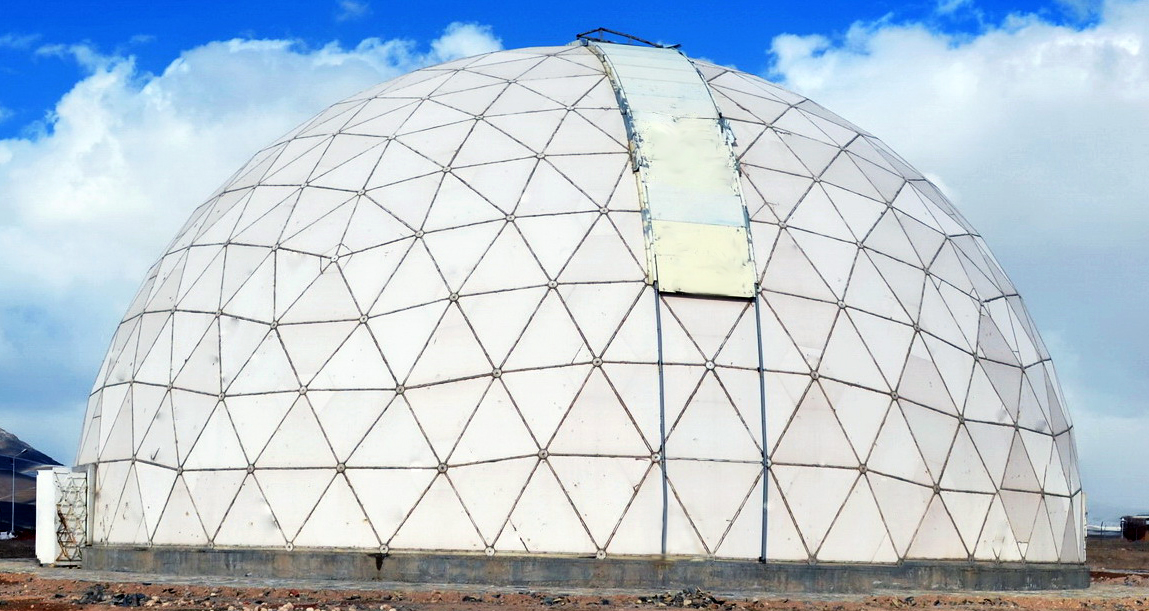
The Maragha Observatory in Iran

Besides his knowledge of history and theology, Barhebraeus was also a skilled mathematician and astronomer. Nasir al-Din al-Tusi and other researchers at the Maragha Observatory had a major influence on his primary scientific work, "Ascent of the Mind" (Sullaqā Hawnānāyā), which he wrote in 1279 and used as a textbook of mathematics and astronomy. It was partially based on al-Tusi's Tadhkira fī ʿIlm al-Hayʾa, but it also included Syriac scientific traditions, especially those of Severus Sebokht, whom Barhebraeus specifically mentions. Barhebraeus's command of Arabo-Persian astronomical literature is evident in other related works such as "On Creation" and "Candelabrum of the Sanctuary" (Mnārath Qudshē), which also reference al-Biruni's Kitāb al-Tafhīm li-Awāʾil Ṣināʿat al-Tanjīm.

=== Identity and geography ===
The identity and language of the Syriac Orthodox and other Syriac-speaking communities took shape largely in contrast with the Greek and Arab populations, and were increasingly influenced by contact with the Latin West where notions of national identity were already established. Such awareness was reinforced by the composition of Syriac-language chronicles that went beyond mere record-keeping to include reflection on communal origins and identity, such as Michael the Great's Chronicle.

Barhebraeus, along with the Syriac Orthodox people of his time, did not identify as 'Arameans' and rejected the term as a self-designation, even entirely omitting it from the genealogy of Noah's sons. He instead speaks of "ancient Syrians" (Syriac: ܣܘܖ̈ܝܝܐ ܥܬܝܩ̈ܐ, romanised: Sūryōyē ʿatīqē), a term collectively used for all ancient Aramaic speakers i.e., the Assyrians, Babylonians, and Arameans. Among intellectual Assyrians as Barhebraeus, the usage of 'Assyria' did not disappear after Islamic conquests, and he frequently mentioned Assyria (Syriac: ܐܬܘܪ, romanised: Āṯōr) as a contemporary geopolitical designation, clearly differentiating it from Syria (a distinction also observed by the anonymous author known as pseudo-Barhebraeus), which indicates that the names 'Assyria' and 'Assyrian' remained active designations for Syriac-speaking Mesopotamians and their homeland. He used 'Chaldeans' as an umbrella term for the Assyrians and Babylonians whom he equated with the ancient Syrians, and also described the kings of ancient Mesopotamia as "All these are Chaldeans; that is, Syrians (Suryāyē)". Nevertheless, he denounced 'Chaldeanhood' (Kaldōyūtō) as "barbaric".

Generally, 'Syrian' is used inclusively for all Aramaic‑speaking Christians, including those in Mount Lebanon, regardless of precise ethnic origin, although occasional distinctions are made.

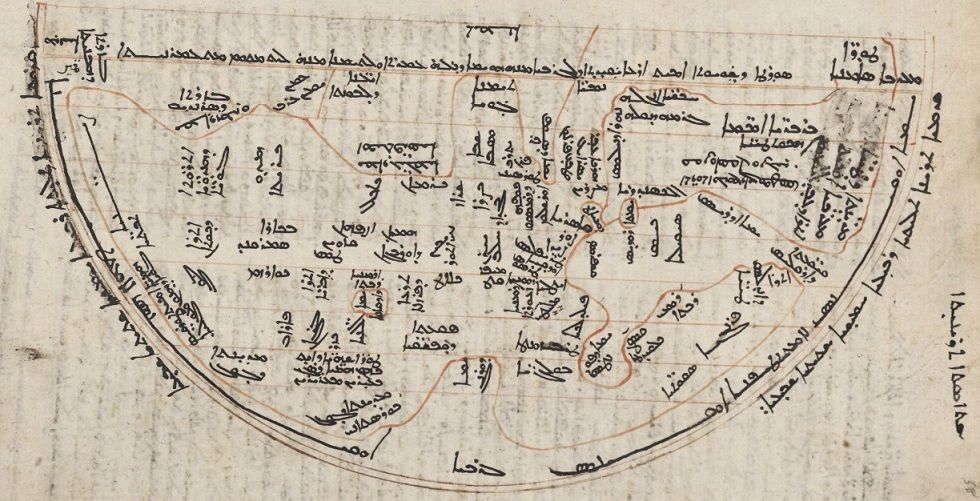
Syriac world map by Barhebraeus, depicting the eastern hemisphere with the north being at the bottom following Islamic cartographic tradition

Geographically, since Barhebraeus and his audience were mainly located in the east, his preference for Tagrit over Edessa becomes evident. Edessa, while still honoured, appears far less frequently in his writings than Baghdad and Mosul; Tagrit, however, held supreme importance for him—it was the first city mentioned in his Chronicon. When recounting the missionary route of Thomas the Apostle, he lists Tagrit, then India, and only afterwards does he return to Edessa and its king Abgar, which highlights the spiritual significance of Tagrit. He saw Thomas as linked to Tagrit, which he hailed as the defender of orthodoxy during the spread of Nestorianism in the East. Tagrit and Tur ‘Abdin, he wrote, remained steadfast against the persecutions initiated by Barsauma of Nisibis. Consequently, Barhebraeus portrayed Tagrit as the true successor to the See of Seleucia-Ctesiphon, in contrast to the Church of the East whose catholicos had been allowed by the caliphs to move to Baghdad, whereas the Tagritian maphrian was not. Thus, Tagrit came to surpass even Edessa and Baghdad in honour.

Barhebraeus rarely used the term 'Jacobite' (after Jacob Baradaeus) except when quoting adversaries who used it, or when referring to certain localised, Arabised communities of the Syriac Orthodox Church. Instead, he preferred expressions such as "our people", "the faithful", and "the orthodox" to denote his own religious community in opposition to the Chalcedonian Greeks and the Nestorians. The broader term "Christians" he reserved for Christendom as a whole going beyond denominational divisions.

Despite his insistence on Miaphysitism and his position as the heir of Seleucia-Ctesiphon, he maintained cordial, fraternal relations with the Church of the East and its patriarch. He deliberately used the term "Easterners" for Christians in both the Syriac Orthodox Church and the Church of the East, adopting a single self‑designation for both milieus and emphasising the shared heritage of the East.

=== Relations ===
Like the Syriac Orthodox Church in general, Barhebraeus maintained good relations with diverse religious and intellectual communities, such as the Crusaders. He probably encountered the Latins during his residence in Antioch and Tripoli (both under Crusader rule) and later continued his visits to the "quasi-Crusader" state of Cilicia after the Crusaders' influence waned. His familiarity with Latin circles led some scholars to suggest that his thought may have been subtly influenced by Roman Catholic scholasticism, but this influence was never dominant. Other scholars do not consider him to be aware of these Latin works despite spending time in Crusader‑held Antioch, Tripoli and Cilicia.

Disillusioned by the Arabs and their conduct, Barhebraeus may have viewed the Mongols as liberators from oppressive Islamic forces, his writings suggesting a pragmatic appreciation of the Mongols' relative tolerance towards Christianity. In this interpretation, he perceived Hulagu as a kind of new Cyrus, freeing God's people from "Babylon", or as a new Constantine through likening Hulagu's Christian mother, Sorghoqtani, to Empress Helena. The Mongol rulers' comparative tolerance towards Christians inspired hopes that a Christian polity might arise under their protection with Syriac as its language.

Within the broader intellectual sphere, Barhebraeus has frequently been paralleled with major European thinkers of the Greek and Latin traditions, described as the Eastern/Syriac counterpart to figures such as the near‑contemporary Thomas Aquinas—his Candelabrum of the Sanctuary likened to Aquinas's Summa Theologica. Other comparisons were made to Albertus Magnus, Pico della Mirandola, Isidore of Seville, and Cicero.

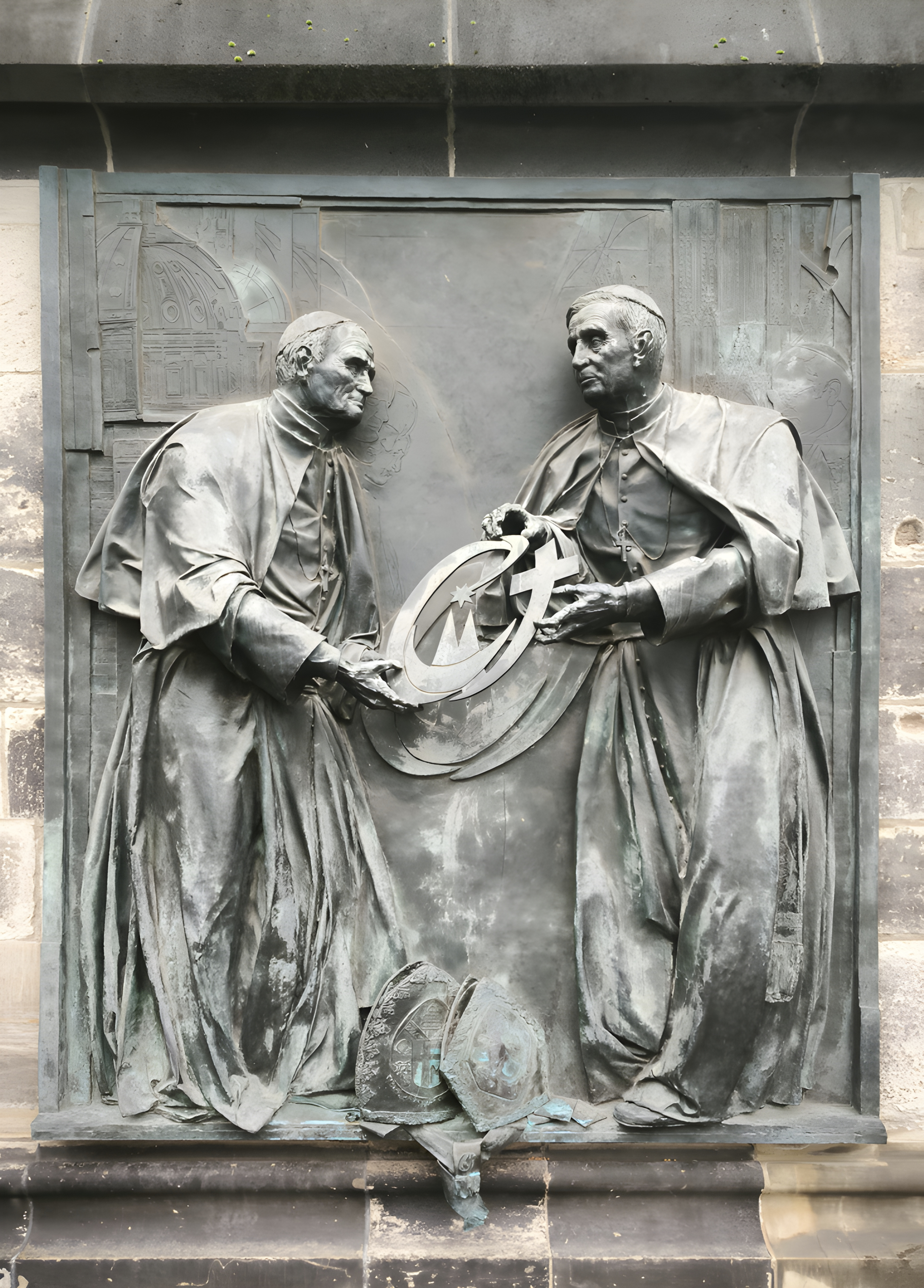
Ecumenical Memorial Plaque at Cologne Cathedral, depicting two clergymen exchanging symbols of unity

Throughout his life, Barhebraeus maintained genial relations with the Church of the East. While sometimes described as an ecumenist, this is an overstatement, as he remained a firm Miaphysite and did not advocate doctrinal union. Nevertheless, he expressed fraternal sentiments towards East Syrians and hoped for the restoration of a unified Syriac Church rooted in the ancient Edessan tradition. His familiarity with East Syrian scholars and contact with Latin Christians (who at the time had achieved communion with the Maronites) may have influenced this outlook. He corresponded courteously with Catholicoi Makkika II (1257–1265) and Denha I (1265–1281), criticising their Christological formulations but emphasising shared Nicene faith. He even cited Church of the East commentaries as authoritative in his Nomocanon, and clergy from the Church of the East attended his consecration of the chrism in Baghdad in 1265. His belief that disputes were merely terminological rather than doctrinal has served as a model for the current ecumenical dialogue between churches today. Upon his death, Catholicos Yahbalaha III (1282–1317) declared a public day of mourning in Maragha attended by "Nestorians, Armenians, and Greeks".

Barhebraeus's intellectual vision embraced both the East and West Syriac traditions which he distinguished as "two illustrious traditions". His writings display a strong familiarity with East-Syriac vocalisation and pronunciation systems, and he frequently cited Church Fathers of the Church of the East such as Narsai and Theodore of Mopsuestia, whom his own Church formally regards as heretical. Overall, his attitude towards these figures and their traditions was one of generous appreciation and respect. Barhebraeus also saw that unity among Syriac Christians was critical to gaining the favour of the Mongols, who were already inclined towards Christianity.

=== Linguistics ===
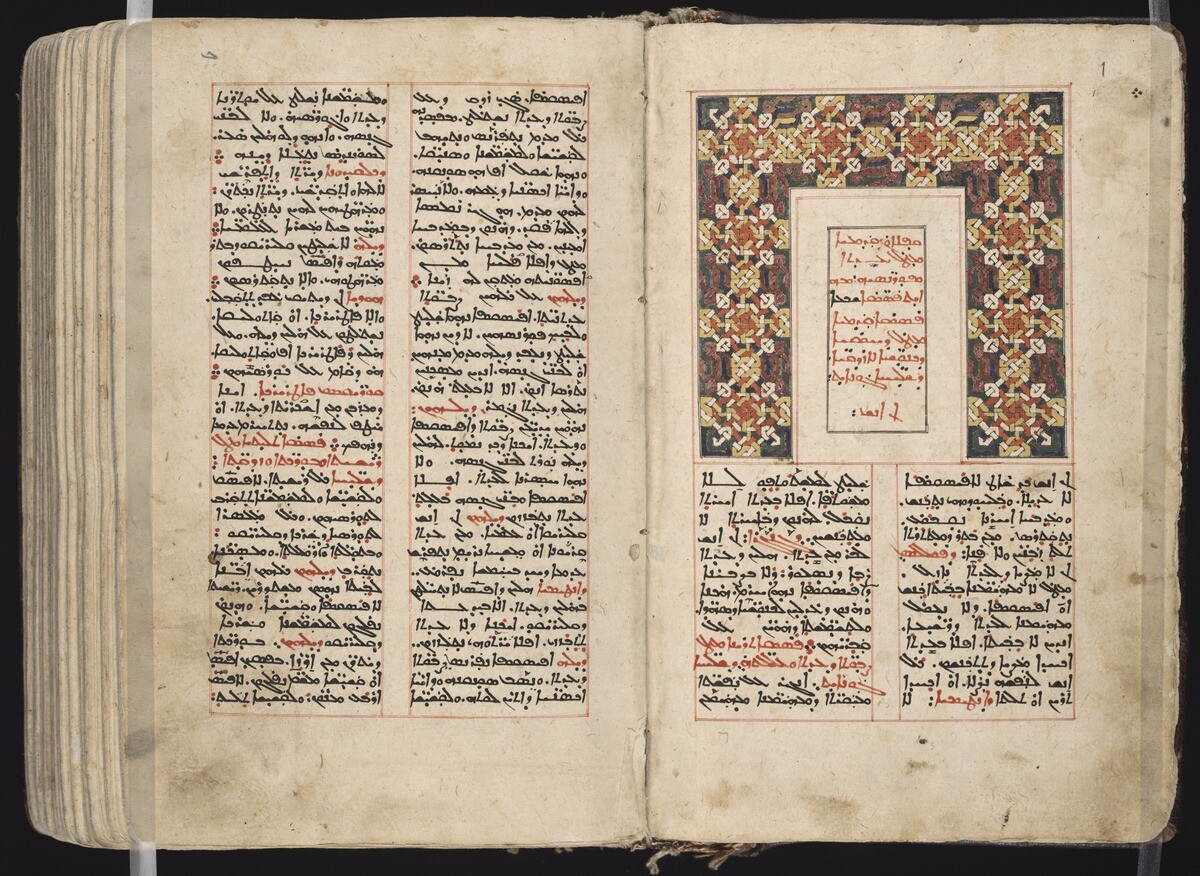
Syriac MS 11. (1699) by Barhebraeus, from his Nomocanon or "Book of Directions" (Kthobo d-Hudoye)

Apart from his native Syriac, Barhebraeus was proficient in Armenian, Arabic and Persian. While some scholars have hypothesised the possibility of Turkic or Mongolian fluency, and have even mentioned that he probably understood something of these languages, he was scarcely proficient in either and wrote in neither. The notion of slight understanding of Greek has been suggested, but it seems unlikely, as by Barhebraeus's time, Greek was in disuse in nearby regions and the liturgy was already wholly conducted in Arabic among the Melkites. Moreover, his writings bear no trace of Greek linguistic influence, for extant Syriac translations of Greek works such as Aristotle and the Septuagint had sufficed.

Barhebraeus considered the Edessan dialect (today termed 'Classical Syriac') the most eloquent of the Aramaic varieties, while he disapproved of the dialect of the "Easterners" found in the Aramaic-language Talmud (the Targum), features of which persist in modern Neo‑Aramaic dialects. He regarded the Aramaic of the Kashkar region (i.e., Nabatean in Babylonia), on the shore of the Tigris in southern Iraq, as the worst of all. Like most early and medieval Christians of the time, Barhebraeus believed that Syriac Aramaic was the original tongue of mankind, the very language God spoke to Adam.

== Select list of works ==
In addition to being a scholar, historian, and physician, Barhebraeus was also a mathematician, astronomer, and lecturer. He authored numerous books on intricate subjects like philosophy, religion, and grammar, presenting them in an easily understandable manner.

The following is a list of only some of his works, a few of which are lost, others unpublished:

- "Storehouse of Secrets" (Awṣar Roze) – A large biblical commentary (philological, literal, and spiritual) drawing on multiple biblical versions, citing authoritative Church Fathers such as Dionysius the Areopagite, John Chrysostom, Cyril of Alexandria, Jacob of Edessa, Michael the Syrian, and many others
- "The Lamp of the Sanctuaries" (Mnorath Qudshe) – A theological and apologetic work defending Christianity against various heresies in Barhebraeus's time
- "The Book of Rays" (Kthobo d-Zalgē) – A compendium of The Lamp of the Sanctuaries, encompassing doctrines of creation, incarnation, angelology, ecclesiology, sacramentology, eschatology, and the afterlife, drawing upon numerous Church Fathers, both orthodox and otherwise
- Nomocanon or "Book of Directions" (Kthobo d-Hudoye) – A vast canonical collection in forty parts, treating subjects such as ecclesiology, sacramentology, economics, law, and ethics. It draws heavily from the patristic corpus and served as an authoritative reference for resolving church disputes. It was later praised by European authorities
- The Ethikon; "Ethics" (Ktābā d-īthīqōn) – Addresses spiritual and moral matters, providing guidance for both ascetics and laypeople
- "The Book of the Dove" (Kthobo d-Yawno) – Named after the Holy Spirit (the Dove), this treatise explores the life of asceticism and spiritual perfection
- Various large volumes on prayer and spirituality – Some written in poetic form, focusing on moral and devotional themes
- "The Cream of Wisdom" (Hewath Hekhemtho) – His magnum opus in philosophy and the natural sciences, comprising multiple volumes and covering Aristotelian philosophy, mechanics, astronomy, meteorology, mineralogy, botany, zoology, astrology, theological anthropology, alchemy, theology, politics, economics, and ethics
- "The Cream of Secrets" (Kitab Zubdat al-Asrār) – A Syriac philosophical translation of Athir al-Din al-Abhari (d. 1266); now lost
- "The Book of Tegrath Tegrotho" (Mercatura Mercaturarum) – An abridgement of The Cream of Wisdom that deals with theology and dialectics
- "Book of the Speech of Wisdom" (Kthobo d-Swodh Sophia) – On dialectics, linguistics, and philosophy
- "Book of the Pupils of the Eyes" (Kthobo d-Bobotho) – A concise treatise on logic and philosophy
- "On the Human Soul" – Two Arabic treatises, the larger composed at the request of Dionysius ‘Anjur, Metropolitan of Melitene before 1252
- "The Book of Indications and Prognostications" (Kitab al-Isharāt wa al-Tanbihāt) – A Syriac translation of Ibn Sina, undertaken at the request of Simon Thomas the Easterner, chief physician of Hulegu
- "Ascent of the Mind" (Kthobo d-Ṣuloqo Hawnonoyo) – A scientific work on astronomy and cosmography with accompanying illustrations and diagrams
- "On the Benefits of the Members of the Body" – A medical work in Arabic, now lost
- Commentary on the Aphorisms of Hippocrates – Written in Arabic, showing Barhebraeus's medical and philosophical synthesis
- Various commentaries and translations – Covering geometry, astronomy, medicine, and oneiromancy (dream interpretation)
- "The Ecclesiastical History" – A detailed account of the patriarchs of Antioch from Peter up to 1285, also including lists of the maphrians and Nestorian catholicoi
- "Chronography" (Makhthbonuth Zabne) – A universal chronicle beginning with creation and extending to 1285, regarded as his most significant historical work
- Tarikh Mukhtaṣar al-Duwal – The Arabic version of the Chronography, a compendium of world history with adaptations for Arabic-speaking audience
- "The Book of Lights" (Kthobo d-Ṣinḥe) – A Syriac grammar addressing both East and West Syriac traditions; two further related grammatical books were published
- "Introduction to Grammar" (Kthobo da-Gramatiki) – A grammatical introduction composed in heptasyllabic metre
- "Book of the Sparks" (Kthobo d-Balṣuṣitho) – A large grammar treatise, unfinished and now lost
- "The Book of Humorous Stories" – A collection of tales featuring people and animals, written in a lively narrative style
- Large collections of poems, riddles, and Biblical exegesis

== Veneration and commemoration ==
Mor Gregory Barhebraeus ܓܪܝܓܘܪܝܘܣ ܒܪ ܥܒܪܝܐ Grīgōrīyōs bar ʿEbrōyō

Saint
- Born: John ܝܘܚܢܢ; 1226
- Died: 1286
- Resting place: Mor Mattai Monastery; 36.49°N 43.442778°E
- Honored in: Oriental Orthodox Church
- Major shrine: Mor Mattai Monastery
- Feast: 30 July
- Patronage: Scholars, physicians, Archdiocese of Nineveh and Environs
- Tradition or genre: Syriac Christianity

Barhebraeus stands as one of the most venerated saints of the Oriental Orthodox Churches, and a towering figure of pride within the Syriac Orthodox Church. Renowned as both a blessed monastic saint and a genius polymath, he combined sanctity with scholarship and excelled in theology, philosophy, medicine, and the Syriac language. His intellectual output revived Syriac literature and learning in an age when it had declined, thus contributing to what has often been termed the Syriac Renaissance.

His feast day in the Syriac Orthodox Church is observed on 30 July, the date of his death. His relics, interred at Mor Mattai Monastery, remain a major pilgrimage site for the faithful.

In March 1986, Patriarch Ignatius Zakka I Iwas celebrated the "700th anniversary of the passing of Maphrian Barhebraeus to the heavenly abode", dedicating that year's patriarchal encyclical to him. The encyclical included a short biography and encouraged the faithful to emulate his life and teachings, in addition to invoking his intercession. In February 2026, coinciding with the 800th anniversary of Barhebraeus's birth, Patriarch Ignatius Aphrem II issued that year's Lent encyclical, urging the faithful to read the Bible, especially in times of need and danger, in line with Barhebraeus's life and teachings, which emphasised a steadfast dedication to the Gospels.

Patriarch Ignatius Aphrem I Barsoum devoted numerous pages of The Scattered Pearls to praising Barhebraeus, calling him one of the "great philosophers and theologians of the Orient as well as the world" and "the most luminous star that ever shone on the firmament of the Syrian nations and his encyclopaedic knowledge makes him all the more unique and unequalled". He also used many laudatory titles such as "Ocean of Wisdom", "Light of East and West", "King of Learned Men", "Greatest Sage", "Holy Father", and "The Most Learned Man Possessing Divine Knowledge". Barsoum further commended Barhebraeus's mastery of Syriac, Arabic, Armenian, and Persian, writing, "His Syriac style is very powerful, lucid and attractive. Whenever his reader dives into his books he finds unique and precious pearls. He would end his reading by bowing his head in great reverence to the prince of writers, the king of learned men, and without exception, the most famous Syrian scholar".

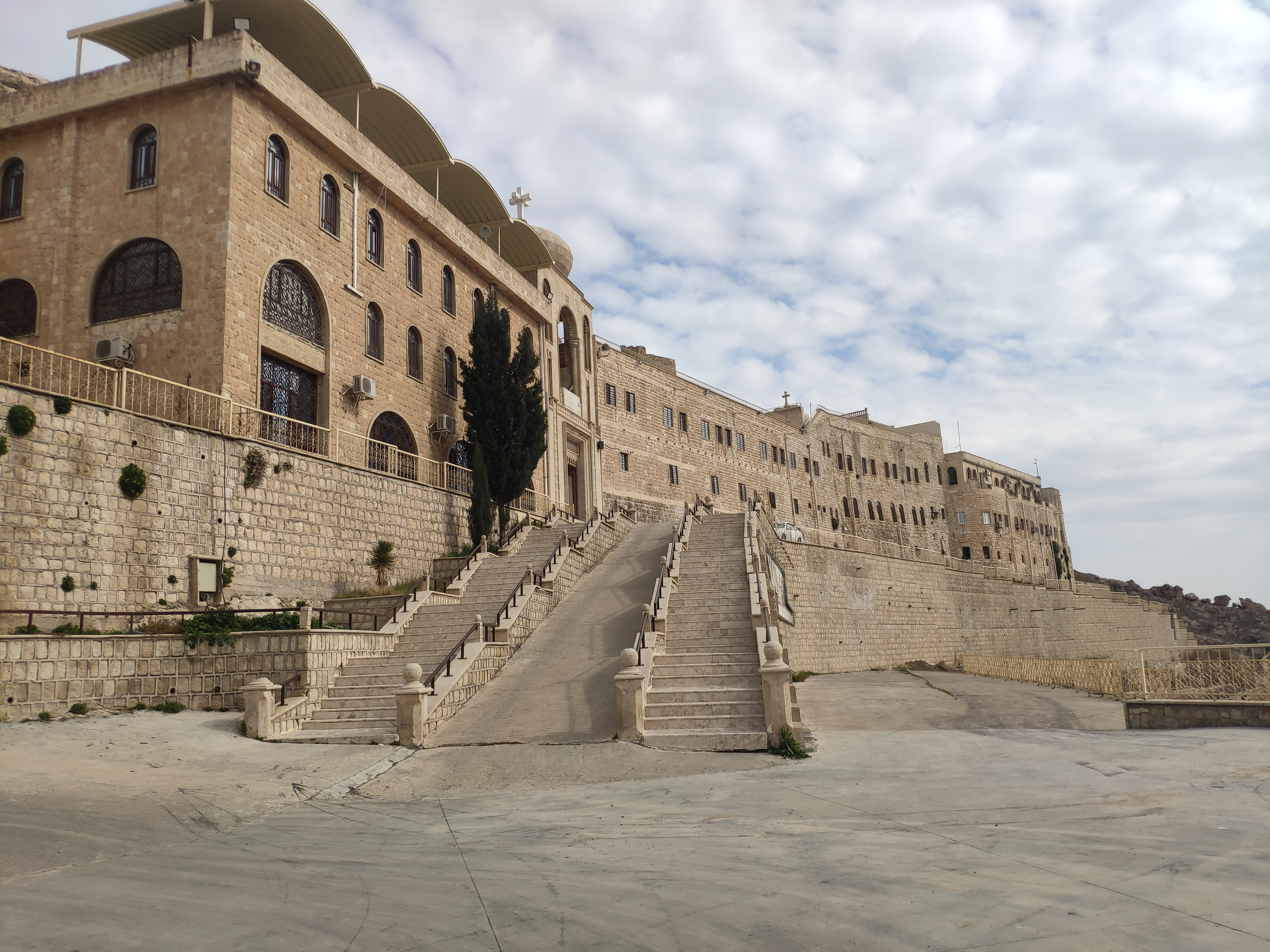
The Monastery of St. Matthew the Hermit in Iraq, where the relics of many saints, including Barhebraeus and his brother, are interred

Other commendatory descriptions include the Syriacist Sebastian P. Brock's, who classed Barhebraeus "alongside Ephrem, perhaps the most famous of all Syriac writers" and described him as "a polymath of extraordinarily wide learning in virtually every subject that was studied in his time". Lucas Van Rompay also called him "a man of an exceptional breadth and open-mindedness", and Rev. Joseph Tarzi hailed him as "the Church's greatest and boldest knight, never to be challenged or matched in all branches of learning—theological and otherwise" and listed his many epithets: "the sea of wisdom, the light of the East and West, king of the learned, the greatest of the wise men, the holy father, the father versed in theology, the adornment of composers, the crown of Maphrians, the crown of chiefs". Paul Bedjan further described his chronicle as "one of the most interesting books that were produced in my country".

In modern commemoration, Barhebraeus continues to be honoured. In 2010, a symposium dedicated to him was organised in Aleppo, Syria by the previous archbishop of Aleppo, Yohanna Ibrahim. Contemporary scholars frequently refer to Barhebraeus as the "Encyclopaedia of the 13th century", which entirely captures his unmatched knowledge and lasting influence throughout the Syriac, Arabic, and wider Eastern intellectual sphere.

== Sources ==
- Barsoum, Ignatius Aphram (2003). The Scattered Pearls: A History of Syriac Literature and Sciences. Translated by Moosa, Matti (Second rev. ed.). Piscataway (N. J.): Gorgias Press, LLC. ISBN 1-931956-04-9.
- Bedjan, Paul, ed. (1890). Gregorii Barhebraei Chronicon Syriacum e codd. mss. emendatum ac punctis vocalibus adnotationibusque locupletatum. Paris: Maisonneuve.
- Bohas, Georges (2008). "Barhebraeus et la tradition grammaticale syriaque" (PDF). Parole de l'Orient. 33: 145–158.
- Brock, Sebastian P. (1989). "Three Thousand Years of Aramaic Literature". ARAM Periodical. 1 (1): 11–23.
- Brock, Sebastian P. (12 July 2011). A Brief Outline of Syriac Literature. Gorgias Press, LLC. doi:10.31826/9781463232498. ISBN 978-1-4632-3249-8.
- Budge, Ernest A. Wallis, ed. (1932a). The Chronography of Gregory Abû'l Faraj, the Son of Aaron, the Hebrew Physician, Commonly known as Bar Hebraeus. Vol. 1. London: Oxford University Press.
- Budge, Ernest A. Wallis, ed. (1932b). The Chronography of Gregory Abû'l Faraj, the Son of Aaron, the Hebrew Physician, Commonly known as Bar Hebraeus. Vol. 2. London: Oxford University Press.
- Conrad, Lawrence I. (1994). "On the Arabic Chronicle of Bar Hebraeus: His Aims and Audience" (PDF). Parole de l'Orient. 19: 319–378. Archived from the original (PDF) on 30 July 2021.
- Dinno, Khalid S. (2017). The Syrian Orthodox Christians in the Late Ottoman Period and Beyond: Crisis, Then Revival. Gorgias Eastern Christian studies. Piscataway (N.J.): Gorgias Press, LLC. ISBN 978-1-4632-0575-1.
- Dinno, Khalid; Harrak, Amir (2009). Harrak, Amir; Brock, Sebastian; Greatrex, Marina; Griffith, Sidney; Lehto, Adam; Rompay, Lucas van (eds.). "Journal of the Canadian Society for Syriac Studies Volume 9 Issue 1". De Gruyter Brill. Six Letters from Paul Bedjan to Aphram Barsoum, the Syriac Orthodox Archbishop of Syria and Aleppo. 9 (1). Gorgias Press, LLC: 55–73. doi:10.31826/jcsss-2009-090106.
- Farina, Margherita (2015). "La Grammatica Metrica di Barhebraeus (XIII sec.) e le sue glosse: Siriaco, greco e arabo in contatto". Rappresentazioni linguistiche dell'identità. Napoli: Università degli Studi di Napoli. pp. 107–125.
- Farina, Margherita (2016). "Barhebraeus' Metrical Grammar and Ms. BML Or. 298: Codicological and Linguistic Remarks". Studi classici e orientali. 62: 345–360.
- Farina, Margherita (2017). "The Syro-Arabic Glosses to Barhebraeus' Metrical Grammar". Language and Identity in Multilingual Mediterranean Settings: Challenges for Historical Sociolinguistics. Berlin-Boston: Walter de Gruyter. pp. 157–170. ISBN 9783110554274.
- Frye, Richard N. (2002). "Mapping Assyria". Ideologies as Intercultural Phenomena (PDF). Milano: Università di Bologna. pp. 75–78. ISBN 9788884831071.
- Griggs, Jennifer (2022). Gregory Barhebraeus' Mystical Hermeneutics of the Love of God in Dialogue with Islamic Tradition. Gorgias Press, LLC. ISBN 978-1-4632-4247-3.
- Habbabé, Dibo (2018). "Comparing the Syriac and Arabic Chronicles of Barhebraeus: The Question of Intended Audiences". The Harp. 33: 205–268.
- Hambye, Édouard R. (1990). "Bar Ebroyo and the Byzantine Empire". V Symposium Syriacum 1988. Roma: Pontificium institutum studiorum orientalium. pp. 403–408.
- Ignatius Aphrem II (14 February 2026). "المنشور البطريركي الخاص بالصوم الأربعيني المقدس 2026" [The Patriarchal Statement on the Holy Lent 2026]. Department of Syriac Studies (in Arabic).
- Ignatius Zakka I Iwas (17 March 1986). "الذكرى المئوية السابعة للقديس المفريان ابن العبري" [The 700th Anniversary of Saint Barhebraeus the Maphrian]. Department of Syriac Studies (in Arabic).
- Rajan, K. Mani (2007). Martyrs, Saints & Prelates of The Syriac Orthodox Church (PDF). Vol. 1. The Travancore Syriac Orthodox Publishers.
- Martin, Jean-Pierre-Paulin, ed. (1872a). Oeuvres grammaticales d'Abou'lfaradj dit Bar Hebreus. Vol. 1. Paris: Maisonneuve.
- Martin, Jean-Pierre-Paulin, ed. (1872b). Oeuvres grammaticales d'Abou'lfaradj dit Bar Hebreus. Vol. 2. Paris: Maisonneuve.
- Mazzola, Marianna (2018). "The Textual Tradition of Bar Ebroyo's Chronicle: A Preliminary Study". Le Muséon. 131 (1–2): 73–100.
- Mazzola, Marianna (2020). "From High Priest to Patriarch: History and Authority in the Ecclesiastical History of Bar Ebroyo". Corpus Scriptorum Christianorum Orientalium, Subsidia. Louvain: Peeters Publishers.
- Rompay, Lucas Van (1 March 2010). "Past and Present Perceptions of Syriac Literary Tradition". Hugoye: Journal of Syriac Studies. 3 (1): 71–104. doi:10.31826/hug-2010-030105. ISSN 1097-3702.
- Schmitt, Jens Ole (2020). "Some Remarks on East Syrian Influences Found in Barhebraeus's Works". Griechische Philosophie und Wissenschaft bei den Ostsyrern. Berlin-Boston: Walter de Gruyter. pp. 157–175. ISBN 9783110667349.
- Takahashi, Hidemi (2013). Barhebraeus: A Bio-Bibliography. Piscataway, NJ: Gorgias Press. ISBN 9781593331481.
- Takahashi, Hidemi (2007). "Barhebraeus: Gregory Abū al-Faraj". The Biographical Encyclopedia of Astronomers. New York: Springer. ISBN 978-0-387-31022-0. (PDF version)
- Takahashi, Hidemi (2011). Brock, Sebastian P.; Butts, Aaron Michael; Kiraz, George A.; Rompay, Lucas Van (eds.). Gorgias Encyclopedic Dictionary of the Syriac Heritage. Gorgias Press, LLC. ISBN 9781593337148.
- Takahashi, Hidemi; Yaguchi, Naohide (2017). "On the Medical Works of Barhebraeus: With a Description of the Abridgement of Ḥunain's Medical Questions". Aramaic Studies. 15 (2): 252–276. doi:10.1163/17455227-01501005. ISSN 1477-8351.
- Tannous, Jack (2025). "What Is Syriac? Explorations in the History of a Name". Beth Mardutho: The Syriac Institute and Gorgias Press. Hugoye: Journal of Syriac Studies. 28 (1): 65–153.
- Tarzi, Joseph (31 October 1996). "Maphryono Mar Gregorious Youhanon Bar Ebroyo". Syriac Orthodox Resources.
- Taylor, David G. K. (2011a). "Syriac Lexicography". Gorgias Encyclopedic Dictionary of the Syriac Heritage. Piscataway, NJ: Gorgias Press. pp. 391–393.
- Teule, Herman G. B. (1996). "The Crusaders in Barhebraeus' Syriac and Arabic Secular Chronicles: A Different Approach". East and West in the Crusader States: Context, Contacts, Confrontations. Vol. 1. Leuven: Peeters Publishers. pp. 39–49. ISBN 9789068317923.
- Teule, Herman G. B. (1999). "It is Not Right to Call Ourselves Orthodox and the Other Heretics: Ecumenical Attitudes in the Jacobite Church in the Time of the Crusaders". East and West in the Crusader States: Context, Contacts, Confrontations. Vol. 2. Leuven: Peeters Publishers. pp. 13–27. ISBN 9789042907867.
- Teule, Herman G. B. (2003). "Gregory Barhebraeus and his Time: The Syrian Renaissance". Journal of the Canadian Society for Syriac Studies. 3 (1): 21–43. doi:10.31826/jcsss-2009-030104. S2CID 212688549.
- Teule, Herman G. B. (2006). "The Ecclesiastical Chronicle of Gregory Bar Ebroyo". Journal of the Canadian Society for Syriac Studies. 6: 61–81. doi:10.31826/jcsss-2009-060108.
- Teule, Herman G. B. (2009). "Reflections on Identity: The Suryoye of the Twelfth and Thirteenth Centuries: Bar Salibi, Bar Shakko, and Barhebraeus". Church History and Religious Culture. 89 (1–3): 179–189. doi:10.1163/187124109X407899.
- Teule, Herman G. B. (2012). "Barhebraeus". Christian-Muslim Relations: A Bibliographical History. Vol. 4. Leiden-Boston: Brill. pp. 588–609. ISBN 978-9004228542.
- Teule, Herman G. B. (2013). "Gregory Bar Ebrōyō and Abdisho Bar Brikhā: Similar but Different". Orientalia Christiana: Festschrift für Hubert Kaufhold zum 70. Geburtstag. Wiesbaden: Harrassowitz Verlag. pp. 543–551. ISBN 9783447068857.
- Todt, Susanne Regina (1988). "Die Syrische und die Arabische Weltgeschichte des Bar Hebraeus - ein Vergleich". Der Islam: Zeitschrift für Geschichte und Kultur des Islamischen Orients. 65 (1): 60–80.
- Weltecke, Dorothea (2016). "Bar ʻEbroyo on Identity: Remarks on his Historical Writing". De Gruyter Brill. Hugoye: Journal of Syriac Studies. 19 (2): 303–332. doi:10.31826/hug-2018-190107.
- Weltecke, Dorothea; Younansardaroud, Helen (2019). "The Renaissance of Syriac Literature in the Twelfth–Thirteenth Centuries". The Syriac World. London: Routledge. pp. 698–717. ISBN 9781138899018.
- Wilmshurst, David, ed. (2016). Bar Hebraeus: The Ecclesiastical Chronicle: An English Translation. Piscataway, NJ: Gorgias Press. ISBN 9781463205355.
- Witakowski, Witold (2006). Harrak, Amir; Brock, Sebastian; Greatrex, Marina; Griffith, Sidney; Lehto, Adam; Rompay, Lucas van (eds.). "Journal of the Canadian Society for Syriac Studies Volume 6 Issue 1". De Gruyter Brill. The Ecclesiastical Chronicle of Gregory Bar‘Ebroyo. 6 (1). Gorgias Press, LLC: 61–81. doi:10.31826/jcsss-2009-060108.
- Wright, William (1894). A Short History of Syriac Literature. London: Adam and Charles Black.
