= Maphrian =

Religious position in the Syriac Orthodox Church of Antioch

The Maphrian (Syriac: ܡܦܪܝܢܐ, romanized: maphryānā or maphryono), is the second-highest rank in the ecclesiastical hierarchy of the Syriac Orthodox Church, right below that of patriarch. The office of a maphrian is a maphrianate. There have been three maphrianates in the history of the Syriac Orthodox Church and one, briefly, in the Syriac Catholic Church.

The first maphrianate, called the Maphrianate of the East or the Maphrianate of Tagrit, was established in 628 to give the Syriac Orthodox Church an ecclesiastical hierarchy in the Sasanian Empire and lands outside the control of the Roman Empire. The seat of the bishop was initially at Tagrit and he ranked second in the hierarchy after the Patriarch of Antioch. Initially he used the title catholicos in direct opposition to the rival Catholicos of Seleucia-Ctesiphon of the Church of the East. The title "maphrian" first came into use around 1100. In 1156 the seat of the maphrian was moved to Mosul. The Maphrianate of the East was abolished in 1860 as a result of a decreasing number of Syriac Orthodox outside of the region of Ṭur ʿAbdin. By then it had been a merely titular see for a long time.

The second maphrianate was the Maphrianate of Ṭur ʿAbdin established in 1495 under the jurisdiction of the Patriarch of Ṭur ʿAbdin. It is unclear what kind of jurisdiction this maphrian exercised. No new maphrian was appointed after the death of the last one in 1844.

The sole Syriac Catholic maphrian was Baselios Isḥaq Jbeir who took the title in 1693. Although elected patriarch, he refused the title, keeping his position as a Maphrian, thus not establishing a patriarchal line.

In the 20th century a new maphrianate nominally under the Syriac Orthodox Church was established in India in 1912, creating a new autocephalous church, the Malankara Orthodox Church. This was not recognized by the then-reigning Patriarch of Antioch until 1958, at the consecration of Baselios Augen I. This line however, once again declared autonomy, and the unity deteriorated in 1975, when the Malankara Orthodox Church split again from the Jacobite Syrian Christian Church (an integral branch of the Syriac Orthodox Church). The Patriarch withdrew recognition from Baselios Augen and consecrated Baselios Paulose II. Since then there have been two separate lines. The current line recognized by the Syriac Orthodox Church is known as the Catholicos of India. The current Maphrian is Baselios Joseph.

== Etymology ==
The word "maphrian" is an Anglicisation of the Arabic mafiryān, itself from Syriac maphryono (mprynʾ), which means "one who bears fruit, fructifier", metaphorically "consecrator" of bishops.

== History ==
The ecclesiastical position dates back to the seventh century; however, its origins began with the instatement of the Catholicos of the East in the fifth century, which was made to unite Christians within the Sassanian Empire under a single ecclesiastical authority and act as a link with the Christians within the Roman Empire. However, after the Nestorian Schism in 431, the teachings of Nestorius were branded heretical at the First Council of Ephesus and Nestorians were forced to relocate to the Sassanian Empire. From this point on the catholicate became increasingly Nestorian, forcing the few remaining Persian Miaphysites, such as Philoxenus of Mabbug, into exile.

Despite this, within the Sassanian Empire, the Mesopotamian town of Tagrit alone did not adopt Nestorianism and would become the centre of Miaphysite missions. With the birth of the Syriac Orthodox Church in the late sixth century, the office of Metropolitan of the East was created by the energetic Jacob Baradaeus for the bishop Ahudemmeh, however he was executed by the Sassanians in 575. During this period, Miaphysites were subject to a great deal of persecution from the Sassanians, under suspicion that as they obeyed a spiritual head residing in Byzantine territory, they were therefore inclined to support the Byzantines. This was spurred on by accusations of favouring the Byzantines from Nestorians at the Shah's court at Ctesiphon; thus encouraging further persecution.

During this period, the Persians were known to enslave much of the Roman territory they conquered and return with a multitude of captives, including Byzantines, Egyptians and Syrians, increasing the number of Miaphysites within Persia. The Miaphysites were under the authority of the Syriac Orthodox Metropolitan of the East until 624 when the seat was left empty for five years. So once the hostilities had drawn to a close at the end of the Byzantine–Sasanian War of 602–628, in 629 the Syriac Orthodox Patriarch Athanasius I Gammolo appointed Marutha of Tagrit as the first maphrian, with the task of organising the Miaphysites in the Sassanian Empire from the Miaphysite stronghold of Tagrit.

The efforts of Marutha of Tagrit were to be crowned with greater success than the previous metropolitans with the assistance of Chosroes II's physician, Gabriel de Shiggar, who had completely won the confidence of the Christian queen Shirin. This allowed him to rebuild churches and administer the church. He also undertook fruitful missionary work among the Arabs and throughout the valley of the Tigris, spreading the Syriac Orthodox faith. With the appointment of the maphrian came large ecclesiastical autonomy from the Church in Antioch. This was done to help improve the position of Miaphysites within the Persian Empire, refuting accusations of favouring the Byzantines.

Over time, the relations between the Maphrian and the Syriac Orthodox Patriarch of Antioch became increasingly strained, and at times lead to schisms and interference into the election of both maphrian and patriarch. In 869, the Council of Capharthutha was held to regulate the relationship and resolve the differences between the two positions. The Council agreed that just as the patriarch consecrated the Maphrian, the consecration of a new Patriarch would be reserved to the Maphrian and that both would avoid interfering in the administration of the other.

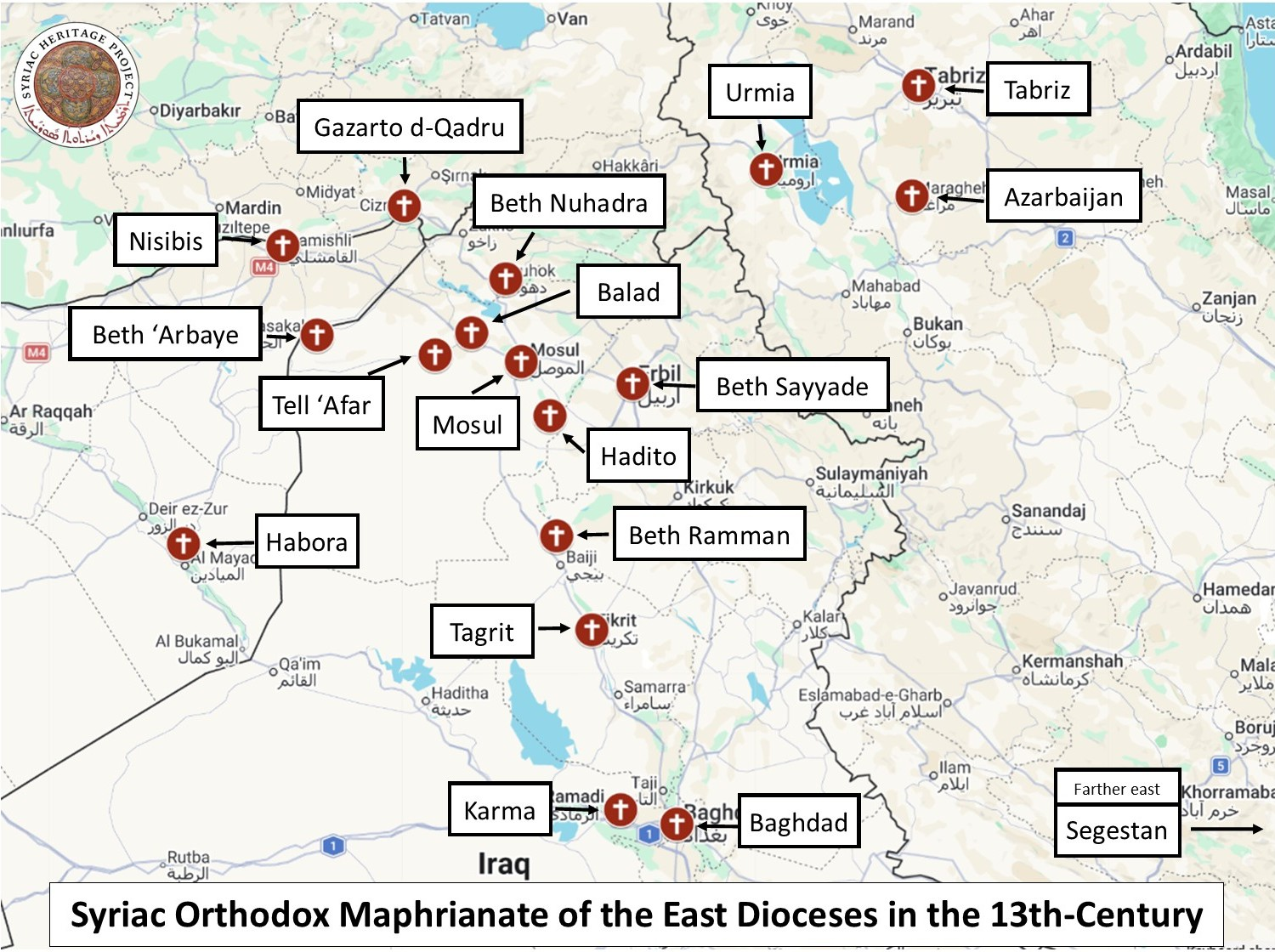
Maphrianate of the East Dioceses in the 13th-Cnetury

However, the Maphrians often had disputes with bishops within his own administration, such as the metropolitan of the Monastery of Mar Mattai near Nineveh, who was jealous of the preponderating influence of Tagrit. The maphrianate was based in Tagrit until 1089 upon the destruction of the main cathedral, known as the Green Church and was relocated to Mosul. The maphrian returned to Tagrit where he united the two sees of Nineveh and Tagrit in 1152 before being forced to permanently move to the Monastery of Mar Mattai in 1155 whilst retaining an immediate jurisdiction over Tagrit and Nineveh.

From 1533, the title was changed to the Maphrian of Mosul to distinguish it from the new office of Maphrian of Tur Abdin. In time, the number of Syriac Orthodox Christians in Mesopotamia decreased, and the maphrianate lost its original significance. It became largely a titular designation for the Syriac Orthodox Church's second highest office until being abolished altogether in a synod of 1860.

In 1964, the title was resurrected for use by the regional head of the Syriac Orthodox Church in India (Jacobite Syrian Christian Church). The current Maphrian is Baselios Joseph I, who was enthroned on March 25th, 2025.

== Ecclesiastical jurisdiction ==
The following dioceses were suffragans of the Maphrianate of the East at various points in its existence:

1. Beth 'Arbaye
2. Sinjar
3. M'altha
4. Arzen
5. Gomel or Marga
6. Beth Ramman (Baremman) or Beth Waziq (Bawazij)
7. Karma
8. Beth Zabdai, later moved to Jazirat Ibn ʿUmar
9. Beth Nuhadra
10. Peroz-Shapur
11. Shahrzur
12. Al-Hirah
13. Anah and the Banu Taghlib
14. Nineveh and Mosul
15. Baghdad
16. Monastery of Saint Matthew
17. Aqula (Kufa)
18. Narsibad
19. Kurum
20. Qronta
21. Beth Arsham
22. Hassasa
23. Tirhan
24. Balad
25. Beth Saida
26. Sistan
27. Herat
28. Tabriz
29. Urmia
30. Nisibis
31. Bahrain
32. Julamerk
33. Monastery of Saint Behnam

== See also ==
- List of maphrians
- Catholicos of India

== Bibliography ==
- Barsoum, Aphrem (2009). The Collected Historical Essays of Aphram I Barsoum. Vol. 1. Translated by Matti Moosa. Gorgias Press.
- Herbermann, Charles, ed. (1913). "Maphrian" . Catholic Encyclopedia. New York: Robert Appleton Company.
- Kiraz, George A. (2011). "Maphrian". In Sebastian P. Brock; Aaron M. Butts; George A. Kiraz; Lucas Van Rompay (eds.). Gorgias Encyclopedic Dictionary of the Syriac Heritage: Electronic Edition. Gorgias Press.
- Meyendorff, John (1989). Imperial unity and Christian divisions: The Church 450-680 A.D. The Church in history. Vol. 2. Crestwood, NY: St. Vladimir's Seminary Press. ISBN 9780881410556.
- Takahashi, Hidemi (2018). "Maphrian". In Oliver Nicholson (ed.). The Oxford Dictionary of Late Antiquity. Oxford University Press. p. 957.
- Wilmshurst, David (2019). "West Syrian patriarchs and maphrians". In Daniel King (ed.). The Syriac World. Routledge. pp. 806–813.
