= Jacob Baradaeus =

Syriac Orthodox Bishop of Edessa (c. 500–578)

Saint Jacob Baradaeus

Bishop of Edessa
- Born: c. 500; Tall Mawzalt, Eastern Roman Empire
- Died: 30 July 578 (aged 77–78); Monastery of St. Romanus in Maiuma
- Venerated in: Oriental Orthodox Churches
- Feast: 31 July

Jacob Baradaeus (/ˌbærəˈdiːəs/; Syriac: ܝܥܩܘܒ ܒܘܪܕܥܝܐ, romanized: Yaʿqub Burdʿoyo; Greek: Ἰάκωβος Βαραδαῖος; Arabic: مار يعقوب البرادعي), also known as Jacob bar Addai or Jacob bar Theophilus, was the Bishop of Edessa from 543/544 until his death in 578. He is venerated as a saint in the Oriental Orthodox Churches and his feast day is 31 July. Jacob's missionary efforts helped the non-Chalcedonian Syriac Orthodox Church survive despite persecution, for which it came to bear the name of "Jacobite" Church after its eponymous leader.

== Background ==
Following the Council of Chalcedon in 451, the church in the Eastern Roman Empire suffered division between Chalcedonians, supporters of the council, and non-Chalcedonians, also known as miaphysites and pejoratively called monophysites, who opposed the council. Non-Chalcedonians lost political support at the ascension of Emperor Justin I in 518, who subsequently persecuted non-Chalcedonians. Consequentially, the number of non-Chalcedonian religious leaders declined and, despite the widespread support they held in Syria, Armenia, and Egypt, non-Chalcedonianism faced extinction.

== Biography ==
Jacob was born in c. 500 in the city of Constantia (close to modern day Viranşehir), and was the son of Theophilus bar Manu, a priest. At the age of two, Jacob was left in the care of Eustathius, Abbot of the Monastery of Fsilta, and studied Greek, Syriac, and religious and theological texts. Jacob's mother later returned to the monastery and attempted to bring him home, however, Jacob refused to return and declared his dedication to Christ. After his parents' death, Jacob donated his inheritance to the poor and manumitted several slaves he had inherited, to whom he bestowed his parents' house. Later, Jacob was ordained a deacon and priest at the monastery. At this time, Jacob became renowned as a miracle-worker and people came to him seeking healing. Several miracles are attributed to Jacob, such as the resurrection of the dead, the healing of the blind, procurement of rain, and stopping the movement of the sun. He is also reputed to have ended the Siege of Edessa, as Khosrow I was afflicted with a vision and abandoned the effort.

Empress Theodora, a non-Chalcedonian, learned of Jacob and invited him to meet with her at Constantinople, however, he was reluctant to do so. In a vision, Jacob was instructed to travel to Constantinople, and thus, in c. 527, he arrived at the capital. Theodora received Jacob with honour, however, he was uninterested in life at court, and entered the Monastery of Sykai, where he remained for 15 years. Whilst at Constantinople, he gained the favour of Theodora and Al-Harith ibn Jabalah, King of the Ghassanids, both fellow non-Chalcedonians. An outbreak of persecution of non-Chalcedonians carried out by Ephraim, Patriarch of Antioch, spurred Empress Theodora and Al-Harith to urge Pope Theodosius I of Alexandria to consecrate bishops to counter Ephraim and ensure the survival of non-Chalcedonianism. Thus, Jacob was consecrated Bishop of Edessa by Pope Theodosius in Constantinople in 543/544.

After his episcopal appointment, Jacob travelled to Alexandria, where he, with two non-Chalcedonian bishops, consecrated Conon as Bishop of Tarsus and Eugenius as Bishop of Seleucia. He then set about consecrating non-Chalcedonian clergymen throughout Mesopotamia, Anatolia, Syria, Palestine, and Egypt. At this time, through his missionary work, Jacob aimed to restore non-Chalcedonianism as the official position of the church in the Eastern Roman Empire. The Roman government attempted to hinder the non-Chalcedonian revival and imprison Jacob, however, in his travels he wore a disguise and thus became known as Burde'ana, "man in ragged clothes", from which the sobriquet "Baradaeus" is derived. Jacob ordained Sergius bar Karya as Bishop of Harran and Sergius of Tella as Patriarch of Antioch in 544. After Sergius of Tella's death in 547, with Eugenius, Jacob ordained Paul as Patriarch of Antioch in 550. Differences between Jacob and Eugenius and Conon later emerged and Jacob anathematised the pair for their adherence to Tritheism, and they anathematised Jacob on the accusation of adherence to Sabellianism.

In 553, Emperor Justinian I convened the Second Council of Constantinople in an attempt to unite Chalcedonians and non-Chalcedonians. However, the council was unconvincing to Syrian non-Chalcedonians, and Jacob began to form a separate, non-Chalcedonian church, that would later become the Syriac Orthodox Church. Jacob ordained John of Ephesus as Bishop of Ephesus in 558. In 559, Jacob consecrated Ahudemmeh as Metropolitan of the East. In 566, Jacob attended discussions held by Emperor Justin II at Constantinople between Chalcedonians and non-Chalcedonians with the goal of a compromise between the two factions. At the end of the discussions in 567, Justin issued an edict which was agreed upon by all who attended, however, the edict was rejected by a non-Chalcedonian council at Raqqa. Later, in 571, Jacob Baradaeus and other non-Chalcedonian bishops gave their approval to an edict of union with the Chalcedonian church as they both agreed they held the same beliefs but expressed them differently. Jacob and the other bishops subsequently accepted communion from John Scholasticus, Ecumenical Patriarch of Constantinople. This angered many non-Chalcedonians, however, and the bishops withdrew their approval of the edict.

Unbeknownst to Jacob, Paul, Patriarch of Antioch, and several other non-Chalcedonian bishops, had been tortured by the Roman government and unwillingly agreed to adhere to Chalcedonianism. Jacob consequentially forbade Paul from receiving communion and Paul took refuge in the Kingdom of the Ghassanids. Three years later, Paul was brought before a non-Chalcedonian synod and Jacob restored him to communion for his penance. This angered Egyptian non-Chalcedonians, and, in 576, Pope Peter IV of Alexandria deposed Paul as Patriarch of Antioch, contrary to canon law. Jacob denounced Peter. However, in an effort to reunite non-Chalcedonians, he travelled to Alexandria and agreed to give his assent to Paul's deposition on the condition that he was not excommunicated, thus restoring good relations between the Syrian and Egyptian non-Chalcedonians. Nevertheless, on Jacob's return to Syria, many Syrian non-Chalcedonians expressed anger at the compromise and violence erupted between Jacob and Paul's supporters. King Al-Mundhir III ibn al-Harith, Al-Harith's successor, and Paul attempted to discuss the conflict with Jacob, however, he refused to seek another compromise.

Jacob, with several other bishops, abruptly left Syria with the intention of travelling to Alexandria. Whilst en route, Jacob and his group stopped at the Monastery of St. Romanus in Maiuma where they became ill and Jacob died on 30 July 578. According to Cyriacus, Bishop of Mardin, Jacob's remains were kept at the Monastery of St. Romanus until moved to the Monastery of Fsilta in 622. Some historians note the name of the monastery as the Monastery of Cassian.

== Bibliography ==
- Anderson, Gerald H. (1999). Biographical Dictionary of Christian Missions. Wm. B. Eerdmans Publishing. ISBN 9780802846808.
- Barsoum, Ignatius Aphrem (2003). The Scattered Pearls: A History of Syriac Literature and Sciences, trans. Matti Moosa, 2nd rev. ed. Gorgias Press.
- Butin, R. (1907). "Jacob Baradæus". The Catholic Encyclopedia. Robert Appleton Company.
- Gregory, Timothy E. (1991). Jacob Baradaeus. Oxford University Press. ISBN 978-0-19-504652-6.
- Gregory, Timothy E. (2010). A History of Byzantium. John Wiley & Sons. ISBN 9781444359978.
- Irvin, Dale T.; Sunquist, Scott (2001). History of the World Christian Movement: Earliest Christianity to 1453. Orbis Books. ISBN 9781570753961.
- Livingstone, E. A. (2006). Jacob Baradaeus. Oxford University Press. ISBN 978-0-19-861442-5.
- Saint-Laurent, Jeanne-Nicole Mellon (2015). Missionary Stories and the Formation of the Syriac Churches. University of California Press. ISBN 9780520284968.
- Treadgold, Warren T. (1997). A History of the Byzantine State and Society. Stanford University Press. ISBN 9780804726306.
- Venables, Edmund (1911). "Jacobus Baradaeus, bp. of Edessa" . In Wace, Henry; Piercy, William C. (eds.). Dictionary of Christian Biography and Literature to the End of the Sixth Century (3rd ed.). London: John Murray.
- Brock, Sebastian (2011). Brock, Sebastian P.; Butts, Aaron Michael; Kiraz, George A.; Rompay, Lucas Van (eds.). Gorgias Encyclopedic Dictionary of the Syriac Heritage. Gorgias Press, LLC. ISBN 9781593337148.
