= Lawrence Conrad =

British Orientalist and historian of medicine (born 1949)

- Born: Lawrence Irvin Conrad; 1949 (age 76–77)
- Education: Princeton University (PhD)
- Occupations: Historian, scholar

Lawrence Irvin Conrad (born 1949) is a British historian and scholar of Oriental studies, specializing in Near Eastern studies and the history of medicine. He currently serves as historian for the Wellcome Institute for the History of Medicine in London.

== Education and career ==
Conrad received his Ph.D. from Princeton University, completing his dissertation on The Plague in the Early Medieval Near East in 1981. After a brief period working at the American University of Beirut, he moved in 1985 to the Wellcome Institute for the History of Medicine at University College, London. In 2001, he moved to the University of Hamburg, where he remained until his retirement in 2008. Conrad is known for his work on medieval Near Eastern social history, Arabic and Islamic medicine, and Arabic, Greek, and Syriac historiography.

== Selected publications ==
Authored books

- Conrad, Lawrence I.; Neve, Michael; Nutton, Vivian; Porter, Roy; Wear, Andrew (1995). The Western Medical Tradition: 800 BC to AD 1800. Cambridge University Press. ISBN 978-0-521-47564-8.
- Noth, Albrecht; et al. (Conrad, Lawrence I.) (1994). The early Arabic historical tradition: a source-critical study. Translated by Bonner, Michael. Princeton, N.J: Darwin Press. ISBN 0-87850-082-0. OCLC 29953544.

Edited books

- Conrad, Lawrence I., ed. (1996). The World of Ibn Ṭufayl: Interdisciplinary Perspectives on Ḥayy Ibn Yaqẓān. Brill. ISBN 90-04-10135-7.

Translated books

- Duri, Abd Al-Aziz (1983). The Rise of Historical Writing Among the Arabs. Translated by Conrad, Lawrence I. Princeton University Press. ISBN 978-1-4008-5388-5.
