= Syriac Orthodox Patriarchal Archdiocese of Damascus =

Patriarchal Archdiocese of Damascus

Syriac orthodox Church
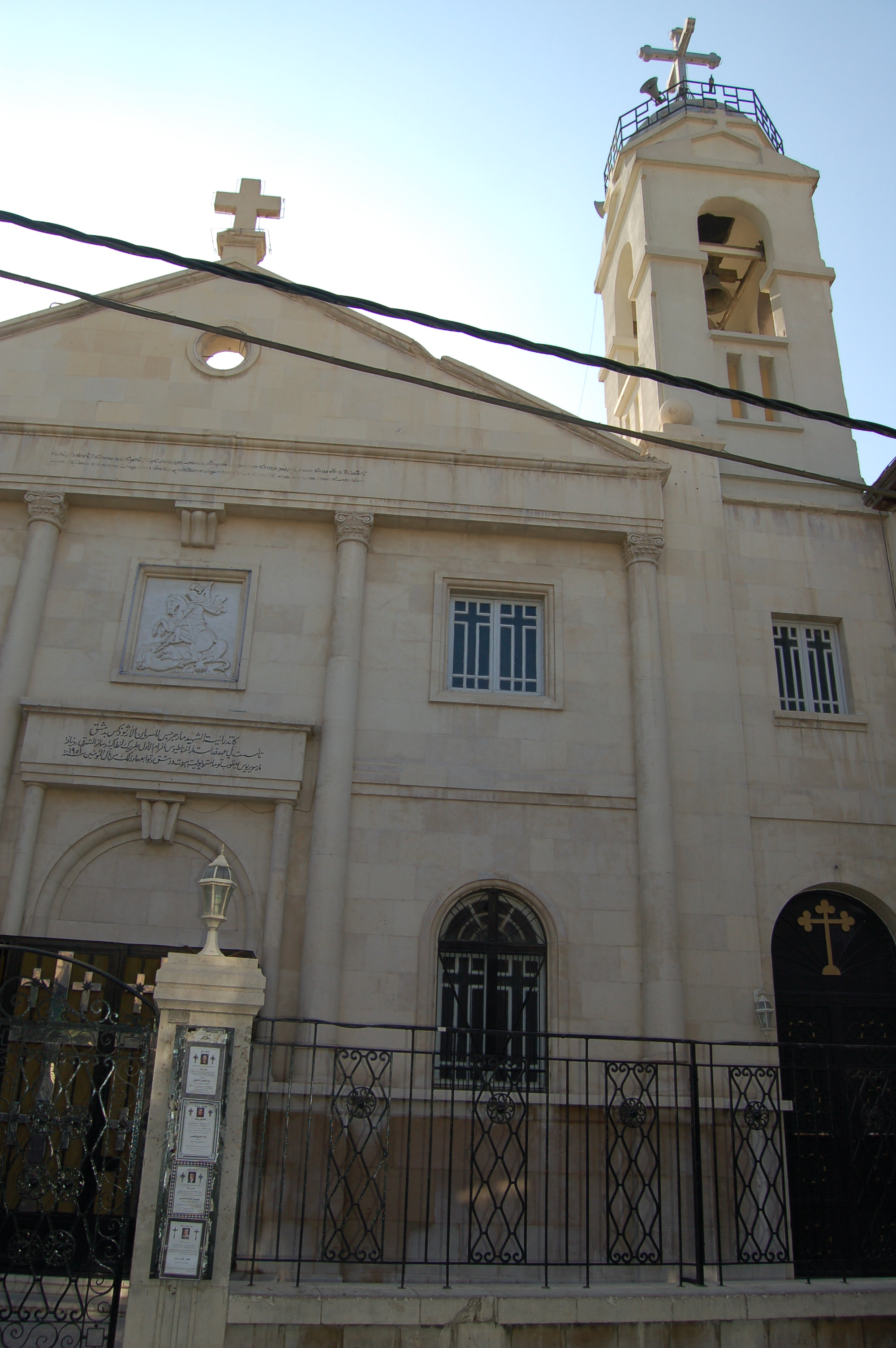
- Incumbent; Ignatius Aphrem II
- Style: His Holiness Moran

Information
- Cathedral: Cathedral of Saint George, Damascus

The Syriac Orthodox Patriarchal Archdiocese of Damascus is the titular seat of the Syriac Orthodox Patriarch of Antioch and All the East.

== Early History ==
Christianity entered Damascus at the dawn of the Gospel, leading to the guidance of the Apostle Saint Paul. The episcopal see of the Syriac Metropolis of Damascus (Phoenicia II) was established alongside the emergence of Christianity, with Saint Ananias considered the first bishop to occupy the see, followed by an almost uninterrupted succession of bishops. Notable early leaders included Menghos, who attended the Sixth Council of Antioch in 341, and Theodorus, who attended the Second Council of Ephesus in 449 and the Council of Chalcedon in 451. Following its bishops before the seventh century, episcopal records note Ananias in 685, Peter (whose tongue was cut out by al-Walid in 743), an anonymous bishop who carried synodals to Alexandria in 754, and Anastasius in 818. According to the lists of Mor Michael Rabo (Michael the Syrian), Metropolitan Timothy served from 818 to 845 and was still attested in 846. The succession continued with Solomon and Isaac (847/874), Daniel (887–895), Timothy and Athanasius (896/909), Moses (910/922), John (936/953), Joseph (954/957), Athanasius (958/961), and Theodosius and Theophiles (965/986, the latter attested in 987). Roman, deposed for misconduct around 1000, and Gabriel "Schamahir," first bishop of Sarug around 1150.

Michael’s lists continue through the eleventh and twelfth centuries with Theodosius (1004/1030), Ignatius (1058/1063), John (1091/1129), Dionysius (1129/1137), John in Jerusalem (1168), and John Gregory (after 1168, before 1194/95). The remaining pontifical records contain historical gaps and contradictions across surviving manuscripts and studies, listing John (1211), John (1264), Gregorius of Qartmin (1283/1292), and Philoxenus (1332?). During the fourteenth century, a bishop named Dioscoros Jacob Qenaya (1360) committed a series of contentious acts. After being rejected by Syriac Orthodox Patriarch Ismail of Mardin in his request to be ordained as a Maphrian, Qenaya offered forty thousand piastres to Al-Malik al-Salih, the ruler of Mardin, to force the Patriarch's compliance. Following the Patriarch's continued refusal, Qenaya traveled to the Monastery of Mar Matthew and instructed the local monks to act as church authorities; unaware of the true nature of the texts they were reading, the monks recited the ordination of deacons over him instead of the ordination of Maphrians, leading to his excommunication by the Patriarch. Qenaya persisted in his delusion and approached the Patriarch of Cilicia, who named him a Maphrian in 1361 and sent him to Bartella as a Maphrian intruder. The ruler of Bartella banished him to Tikrit, from where he traveled to Baghdad, where jurists killed him, burned his corpse, and threw it into the Tigris.

Among the prominent metropolitans of Damascus was Philoxenus the Scribe, a skilled writer and scholar who was installed as Syriac Orthodox Patriarch from 1387 to 1421 while residing in the Levant. He was succeeded by Simon of Man’em, who was consecrated by the Coptic patriarch in 1421 and died in 1445, followed by Joseph ibn Nisan (1445–1455). In the fifteenth century, regional unrest led to the disintegration of dioceses across Syria and the dispersal of their populations, leaving Damascus without a resident bishop and causing the see to be united with that of Jerusalem from the mid-fifteenth to the mid-sixteenth century. Office holders during this period were Dioscorus ibn Isho of Nebek (1455), Noah of Baqufa the Lebanese (before 1489, patriarch in 1494 under Ignatius Noah of Lebanon), and Gregorius Joseph Kurji, 1510–1537), who held the combined title of Metropolitan of Homs, Damascus, Tripoli, and Hardine. During his tenure, Gregorius Joseph Karji composed prayers of forgiveness (Housoyé) and revised liturgical prayers recited over monks wearing the leather schema of Saint Anthony.

Subsequent office holders included Dioscores, son of Michel Isho of Nebek, a copyist in 1559 who bore the title of Nebek in 1581 and met Léonard Abel in 1580 and Gregorius 'Atallah who was deposed around 1650, after which he went to Malabar. In the seventeenth century, Bishop John bin Gharir (also recorded as John son of Sarkis, 1666–1684) served the see, mentoring Deacon Sarkis (who died in 1669) and translating Gregorius Bar ‘Ebroyo's Menarat al-Aqdas (Tower of Sanctuaries) into Arabic. Bishop John debated Andrew Akhijan regarding his defection to the Roman Catholic Church and translated the Shhimo (the book of common Syriac Orthodox prayer) into Arabic. He was followed by Dionysius Amrallah (after 1676 until 1680) and Gregorius 'Abd al-Azali (1706–1736), who held the title "bishop of Damascus, Syria and dependencies." In the eighteenth century, Iwanis or Gregorius Thomas (1736–1752) promoted the Syriac language, maintained a fierce protectiveness over it, and recorded his regret over the loss of its textual heritage and the nation's shift away from it toward Arabic. Metropolitan Gregorius John Shqair of Sadad (also recorded as Gregory Jean or Iwannis Ni'mat Allah, son of Isa Shuqayr of Saddad, 1754–1783) translated the history of Mor Michael Rabo into Arabic, composed the Zajaliyah poem The Holy Fast Ended in Peace, and authored hymns dedicated to the Virgin Mary and Mor Moses the Ethiopian.

The Syriac community in Damascus began converting to the Catholic rite in the early eighteenth century through the influence of the Chiha family, who had migrated from Mesopotamia in the late seventeenth century, engaged in trade, and established influence with governors and sultans. Following the family's formal defection from the Syriac Orthodox Mother Church in 1715, attempts by Patriarch Ignatius Isaac II (1709–1724) to reconcile them were unsuccessful, leading to subsequent conversions among Syriac populations in Damascus and surrounding localities such as Salahiyeh, Rashaya, Ain Hallya, Kfar Qouq, Qal'at Jandal, and Qatana. Conversion efforts intensified under Catholic Metropolitan Elias Shadi of Mardin, who urged his Mardin community to take control of the local church by claiming Patriarch George IV of Aleppo (Gregorius Georges Sayyar of Aleppo, who served as Syriac Orthodox Patriarch from 1819 to 1836) was near the end of his life. The defectors seized the church, its properties, and the furniture from the metropolitan cell, and evicted the Patriarch's sister from her home. Patriarch George IV spent 25,000 silver pieces to obtain an order restoring her residence, while his patriarchate was contested by Athanasius 'Abd al-Masih of Amid (who later did penance, became Catholic, returned to Amid, and lived until 1847), and dispatched Metropolitan Yalda of Amida as his deputy to recover the usurped properties in Damascus and Aleppo.

In 1824, Patriarch George traveled to Damascus and ordained Jacob (Gregorius Ya’koub Hulyani Rashayani, son of Al-Hajj Faris Al-Khoury) as metropolitan for the see of the Monastery of Mar Behnam in Damascus, though Jacob defected to the Syriac Catholic Church in 1829. Legal disputes over church property continued as the Chiha family used their influence with local authorities to secure shared usage of the Church at Mar Moses the Ethiopian monastery near Homs, resulting in a judicial ruling that established an alternating arrangement for religious services based on past custom. Supported by French authorities and the Governor of Damascus, Ali Pasha, Syriac Catholic Metropolitan Jacob Halyani won the lawsuit and secured an imperial decree granting his faction rights over the churches and their endowments, retaining control of the church in Damascus until his death in 1877. Following Halyani's defection, Syriac Orthodox Patriarch George V requested that Iyannis Elias (1821–1832), head of the Monastery of Mar Moses, manage the dioceses of Damascus and Homs, but he declined (Saka 2007). Consequently, the Patriarch ordained Matthew Al-Naqar as metropolitan for both dioceses in 1831, though Al-Naqar also defected.

== Modern History ==
In nineteenth-century occupants and bishops of the see included Iwannis Étienne (Bishop of Syria, 1840–1869), Julius Peter of Mosul after 1847, and later Patriarch Ignatius Peter IV in 1871, Julius Abd al-Masih of Qalat Mar'a, Bishop General for Syria in 1886, and later Patriarch Ignatius Abdulmasih II in 1895, Gregorius 'Abd Allah (1890–1895), Bishop of Syria and Amid, who became Catholic before returning to the Syriac Orthodox Church and becoming Patriarch Ignatius Abdullah II in 1906. After that Iwannis Elijah Mansur of Aleppo (1895–1896), Peter Sahda Qasha (Bishop of Syria in 1897, who became Greek Orthodox in 1907 and died in 1925), Julius Abraham (1908–1912), and Dionysius 'Abd al-Nur (1917). In 1894, the diocese of Damascus was assigned to Julius Peter (later Patriarch), who endured persecutions and unrest stirred up by the schismatic group while traveling to Istanbul at exorbitant expense to pursue legal claims to recover the Church of the Levant and the monasteries of Mor Musa Nabk and Mor Elian in Qaryatayn.

Management of the diocese was handled by Severus Ephrem Barsoum, Metropolitan of Syria and Lebanon, until 1932. Following his elevation to Patriarch Ignatius Aphrem I in 1933 and moving the Patriarchal See from Deir al-Za`faran monastery to Homs following the Syriac Genocide Sayfo, the Holy Synod established a unified diocese covering Beirut and Damascus, appointing Ioannis John Kandour as its metropolitan. He was succeeded in 1950 by Severus Jacob Touma, who was elevated to Patriarch as Ignatius Ya’kub III in 1957. Following the installation of Patriarch Ya’koub III in 1957 and the permanent transfer of the patriarchal residence and see from Homs to Damascus, Damascus was designated as an independent diocese in 1958.

== List of bishops ==
From Ignatius Yaq'ub III (1957 -1980) see List of Syriac Orthodox patriarchs of Antioch.

=== Patriarchal Vicar ===
- Mor Cyril Ya’koub (1959–1963)
- Mor Dioscore Luke Shaya (1963–1966)
- Mor Severus Isaac Saka (1970–1980)
- Mor Severus Hawa (1980–1988)
- Mor Iwannis Boulos Al-Souqi (1990-2016)
- Mor Timotheos Matta Al-Khoury (2016-2021)
- Mor Cyril Babi (2021-Present)

== Churches ==
- Cathedral of Saint George, Damascus.
- St. Mary Church, Al Qusur, Damascus.
- St. Jacob Baradaeus Church, Jaramana, Damascus.
- St Jacob of Nisibis Church, Tabbaleh, Damascus.
- St. Peter and St. Paul's Cathedral in Maarat Saidnaya
- St. Mary Church in Saidnaya.

== Figures ==
Year	Faithful	Bishop	Priest	Church
2024	?	3	3	6

== See also ==
- Syriac Orthodox dioceses
