= Ignatius Abdulmasih I =

105th Patriarch of the Syriac Orthodox Church of Antioch (1662–1686)

- Syriac Orthodox Patriarch of Antioch and All the East
- Church: Syriac Orthodox Church
- See: Antioch
- Installed: 1662
- Term ended: 1686
- Predecessor: Ignatius Yeshu II
- Successor: Ignatius George II

Personal details
- Born: al-Ruhā, Ottoman Empire

Ignatius Abdulmasih I was the Patriarch of Antioch and head of the Syriac Orthodox Church from 1662 until 1686. (Note: Also spelt as ʿAbd al-Masīḥ, ʿAbdul Massih, or Hbed Mişoha ("servant of Christ" in Arabic). The patriarchate of Ignatius Abdulmasih I is alternatively placed in 1661–1686.)

== Biography ==
Abdulmasih was born at al-Ruhā and became a monk at Dayr Mār Abḥāy at Gargar. In 1662, upon arrival of the news at Aleppo that the patriarch of Antioch had died and an election for his successor was pending, Catholic missionaries and Francois Baron, the French consul of Aleppo, secured the support of the sultan through bribes, enthroned Ignatius Andrew Akijan as patriarch on 20 August, and Andrew received official recognition in a bara'ah from Sultan Mehmed IV.

Abdulmasih and the bishop Shukr-Allah opposed Andrew and, in the following year, Abdulmasih arrived at Aleppo with the support of the qadi of Amid, claiming the patriarchate, and presented a forged bara'ah of recognition from the sultan, with which he was able to influence both the pasha and qadi of Aleppo. He then occupied the Syriac Orthodox church at Aleppo and forced Andrew to take refuge with the missionaries. However, a new decree was issued by the sultan, dated 21 January 1664, to support Andrew and an official delegate was sent to ensure that he was recognised as patriarch throughout the empire. Despite this, Andrew's jurisdiction remained limited to approximately eight hundred Catholic converts and he secured only the conversion of Abdulmasih's nephew, Gregory Peter Shahbaddin, bishop of Jerusalem, from amongst the Syriac Orthodox hierarchy.

In the aftermath of the rejection of the union with Rome at the Coonan Cross Oath in 1653, the Saint Thomas Christians of Kerala sent letters to various eastern patriarchates with requests to send a bishop to them and thus Abdulmasih dispatched Gregorios Abdal Jaleel, metropolitan of Jerusalem, to Malabar as his apostolic delegate in 1665 and he consecrated Thoma I as bishop of the Saint Thomas Christians in that year.

After the death of Andrew on 24 July 1677, Gregory Peter Shahbaddin, who Andrew had designated as his successor, fell ill whilst on his way to Aleppo, and Abdulmasih was consequently elected as patriarch. In order to secure the support of the Catholics of Aleppo, Abdulmasih claimed to be a Catholic in union with Rome and anathemised opponents of the Council of Chalcedon. Abdulmasih's pretences came to an end with the arrival of his order of investiture from the sultan and he was rejected by the Catholics who held their own synod and elected Gregory Peter Shahbaddin as patriarch.

A letter was sent after the death of Thoma I by his successor Thoma II in 1683 to Abdulmasih to again request that a metropolitan be sent to them. The letter was received and soon followed by the arrival of a delegation from Malabar who further stressed the need for bishops to the patriarch at the Mor Hananyo Monastery. In 1684, Abdulmasih consecrated the Chrism with the assistance of Baselios Yeldo and other bishops and convened a council to discuss the situation in Malabar, at which Yeldo agreed to abdicate as Maphrian of the East and travel to Malabar to support the church there. Yeldo arrived at Kottamankulam in Malabar with the bishop Iyawannis Hidayat Allah and a monk named Matta on 6 September 1685, but died only thirteen days later on 19 September. Iyawannis Hidayat Allah remained and helped to administer the church in Malabar until his death in 1694.

Abdulmasih served as patriarch of Antioch until 1686 and he was buried in the Syrian cemetery, outside the Rum Gate of Amid.

== Episcopal succession ==
As patriarch, Abdulmasih ordained the following bishops:

- Gregory Peter Shahbaddin, bishop of Jerusalem (1662)
- Timothy Yeshu’, metropolitan of Amid (1673?)
- Basilius Jirjis, Maphrian of the East (1684)
- Severus Ishaq, metropolitan of the Mor Mattai Monastery (1684)
- Iyawannis Li’azar, bishop of Mansuriyya (1684)

== Bibliography ==
- Barsoum, Aphrem (2008). The History of Tur Abdin. Translated by Matti Moosa. Gorgias Press.
- Barsoum, Aphrem (2009). History of the Syriac Dioceses. Vol. 1. Translated by Matti Moosa. Gorgias Press.
- Bcheiry, Iskandar (2004). "A List of the Syrian Orthodox Patriarchs between 16th and 18th Century: A Historical Supplement to Michael the Syrian's Chronicle in a MS. of Sadad". Parole de l'Orient. 29: 211–261.
- Burleson, Samuel; Rompay, Lucas van (2011). "List of Patriarchs of the Main Syriac Churches in the Middle East". Gorgias Encyclopedic Dictionary of the Syriac Heritage. Piscataway, NJ: Gorgias Press. pp. 481–491.
- Frazee, Charles A. (2006). Catholics and Sultans: The Church and the Ottoman Empire 1453-1923. Cambridge University Press.
- Ignatius Jacob III (2008). History of the Monastery of Saint Matthew in Mosul. Translated by Matti Moosa. Gorgias Press.
- Ignatius Jacob III (2009). History of the Syrian Church of India. Translated by Matti Moosa. Gorgias Press.
- Joseph, John (1983). Muslim-Christian Relations and Inter-Christian Rivalries in the Middle East: The Case of the Jacobites in an Age of Transition. State University of New York Press.
- Özcoşar, Ibrahim (2014). "Separation and conflict: Syriac Jacobites and Syriac Catholics in Mardin in the eighteenth and nineteenth centuries". Byzantine and Modern Greek Studies. 38 (2): 201–217.
- Varghese, Baby (2011). "Malankara Orthodox Syrian Church". Gorgias Encyclopedic Dictionary of the Syriac Heritage. Piscataway, NJ: Gorgias Press. pp. 256–258.
- Wilmshurst, David (2019). "West Syrian patriarchs and maphrians". In Daniel King (ed.). The Syriac World. Routledge. pp. 806–813.

Preceded by Ignatius Yeshu II	Syriac Orthodox Patriarch of Antioch; 1662–1686	Succeeded by Ignatius George II
