= Ignatius Isaac II =

107th Patriarch of the Syriac Orthodox Church of Antioch (1709–1723)

- Syriac Orthodox Patriarch of Antioch and All the East
- Church: Syriac Orthodox Church
- See: Antioch
- Installed: 1709
- Term ended: 1723
- Predecessor: Ignatius George II
- Successor: Ignatius Shukrallah II

Personal details
- Born: 1647 Mosul, Ottoman Empire
- Died: 18 July 1724 (aged 76–77) Mosul, Ottoman Empire

Ignatius Isaac II was the Patriarch of Antioch and head of the Syriac Orthodox Church from 1709 until his abdication in 1723. (Note: (Arabic: اسحق بطريارك انطاكية; Syriac: ܐܝܣܚܩ ܥܐܙܐܪ). The patriarchate of Ignatius Isaac II is alternatively placed in 1709–1722, or 1709–1724.)

== Biography ==
Isaac ʿAzar was born at Mosul in 1647, and was the son of Maqdisi 'Azar and Maryam. He had brothers named Matthew and Jacob, and two uncles, George and Rizq Allah, through his mother. Isaac became a monk at the nearby Mar Mattai Monastery, where he and his uncle George were both ordained as priests in 1669 by his tutor, Basil Yeldo, Maphrian of the East. In 1673, Isaac and George aided Basil Yeldo in renovating the Mar Mattai Monastery, for which they were fined and imprisoned by the wali of Mosul for a short while.

Basil Yeldo appointed Isaac as the abbot of the Mar Mattai Monastery in 1675 and he was later ordained as metropolitan of the Mar Mattai Monastery by Patriarch Ignatius Abdulmasih I in early 1684 at the Mor Hananyo Monastery, upon which he assumed the name Severus. This took place at the same time as George's ordination as Basil Yeldo's successor as Maphrian of the East.

In April 1687, Isaac was ordained as Maphrian of the East at the Great Church of Mardin by his uncle George, who had been elevated to patriarch of Antioch at the same time, upon which he assumed the name Basil. Throughout George's tenure as patriarch, Isaac was entrusted with the administration of the whole church and thus he ordained several bishops and a number of presbyters, deacons and monks. At Amid, he rebuilt the Church of Mar Yaqub in 1691, and renovated the Church of the Virgin Mary in 1693, to which he added the nave of Saint Jacob of Serugh, on instruction from the patriarch. In 1701, he received permission from the Ottoman sultan to rebuild the churches of Mardin after having travelled to Constantinople and other places, accompanied by the priest Shukrallah.

Whilst Isaac was at Aleppo, George died on 5 June 1708. A synod was thus held at the Mor Hananyo Monastery in 1709, presided over by Maphrian Basil Lazarus of Tur Abdin, and Isaac was unanimously chosen to succeed George as patriarch of Antioch. After having received a certificate of investiture from the Ottoman sultan recognising his ascension to the patriarchal office, Isaac travelled to Amid, where he was consecrated as patriarch at the Church of Maryamānā by Basil Lazarus of Tur Abdin on 8 February 1709, upon which he assumed the name Ignatius.

Isaac served as patriarch until ill health led him to abdicate on 20 July 1723, on which day a synod at the Mor Hananyo Monastery choose Dionysius Shukrallah, metropolitan of Aleppo, as his successor as patriarch of Antioch, with Isaac's approval. Isaac returned to Mosul, where he died on 18 July 1724, and was buried at the Church of Mar Tuma. (Note: Isaac's death is alternatively placed on 11 July 1724.) As maphrian and patriarch, Isaac ordained seventeen bishops.

== Works ==
At the time of the reconstruction of the Church of Mar Yaqub at Amid in 1691, Isaac issued a decree on behalf of the Shamsīyah to attest to their adherence to the Church. The decree was a copy of a document written by the monk David of Homs in c. 1460 and was later found by Patriarch Ignatius George V in 1825 and copied again in Garshuni. He also composed a short grammar book in Syriac in 15 chapters on etymology and morphology whilst maphrian, before 1699.

== Episcopal succession ==
As maphrian and patriarch, Isaac ordained the following bishops:

1. Dioscorus Shukr Allah, metropolitan of the Jazira (1687)
2. Timothy Shukr Allah, metropolitan of Amid (1690)
3. Severus Malke, metropolitan of the Mar Mattai Monastery (1694)
4. Athanasius Murad, metropolitan of the Jazira (1695)
5. Timothy ‘Ata Allah, bishop of Edessa (1699)
6. Dionysius Shukr Allah, metropolitan of Aleppo (1709)
7. Basil Lazarus III, Maphrian of the East (1709)
8. Basilius Shim’un II, Maphrian of Tur Abdin (1710)
9. Yuhanna of Mardin, metropolitan of the Monastery of Mar Abhai, Gargar, and Ḥisn Manṣūr (1712)
10. Basil Matthew II, Maphrian of the East (1713)
11. Gregorius Ayyub (Job), metropolitan of the Monastery of Mar Abhai (1714)
12. Timothy ’Isa, metropolitan of Mor Hananyo Monastery and Mardin (1718)
13. Severus Elias, metropolitan of Edessa (1718)
14. Dioscorus Aho, metropolitan of Jazirat ibn ‘Umar (1718)
15. Gregorius ‘Abd al-Ahad, metropolitan of Jerusalem (1719)
16. Iyawannis Karas, metropolitan of the Mar Behnam Monastery (1722)
17. Basilius Gurgis, ecumenical bishop (1722)

== Bibliography ==
- Barsoum, Aphrem (2003). The Scattered Pearls: A History of Syriac Literature and Sciences. Translated by Matti Moosa (2nd ed.). Gorgias Press.
- Barsoum, Aphrem (2008). History of the Za'faran Monastery. Translated by Matti Moosa. Gorgias Press.
- Barsoum, Aphrem (2009a). History of the Syriac Dioceses. Vol. 1. Translated by Matti Moosa. Gorgias Press.
- Barsoum, Aphrem (2009b). The Collected Historical Essays of Aphram I Barsoum. Vol. 1. Translated by Matti Moosa. Gorgias Press.
- Bcheiry, Iskandar (2004). "A List of the Syrian Orthodox Patriarchs between 16th and 18th Century: A Historical Supplement to Michael the Syrian's Chronicle in a MS. of Sadad". Parole de l'Orient. 29: 211–261.
- Burleson, Samuel; Rompay, Lucas van (2011). "List of Patriarchs of the Main Syriac Churches in the Middle East". Gorgias Encyclopedic Dictionary of the Syriac Heritage. Piscataway, NJ: Gorgias Press. pp. 481–491.
- Ignatius Jacob III (2008). History of the Monastery of Saint Matthew in Mosul. Translated by Matti Moosa. Gorgias Press.
- Ignatius Jacob III (2009). History of the Syrian Church of India. Translated by Matti Moosa. Gorgias Press.
- Kiraz, George A. (2011). "Isḥoq ʿAzar". In Sebastian P. Brock; Aaron M. Butts; George A. Kiraz; Lucas Van Rompay (eds.). Gorgias Encyclopedic Dictionary of the Syriac Heritage. Gorgias Press. p. 217.
- Wilmshurst, David (2019). "West Syrian patriarchs and maphrians". In Daniel King (ed.). The Syriac World. Routledge. pp. 806–813.

Preceded by Basil George	Syriac Orthodox Maphrian of the East; 1687–1709	Succeeded by Basil Lazarus III
Preceded by Ignatius George II	Syriac Orthodox Patriarch of Antioch; 1709–1723	Succeeded by Ignatius Shukrallah II
