= Ignatius Pilate =

101st Patriarch of the Syriac Orthodox Church of Antioch (1591–1597)

- Syriac Orthodox Patriarch of Antioch and All the East
- Church: Syriac Orthodox Church
- See: Antioch
- Installed: 1591
- Term ended: 1597
- Predecessor: Ignatius David II Shah
- Successor: Ignatius Hidayat Allah

Personal details
- Died: 1597 Aleppo, Ottoman Empire

Ignatius Pilate was the Patriarch of Antioch and head of the Syriac Orthodox Church from 1591 until his death in 1597. (Note: Also known as Ignatius Pilatus or Pilate al-Manṣuri.)

== Biography ==
Pilate was from the village of al-Manṣūriyyah near Mardin and was educated at the Mor Hananyo Monastery. He was appointed as Maphrian of the East in 1575 or 1576 and assumed the name Basil. Whilst at the Mar Behnam Monastery, Pilate wrote a letter in 1579/1580 to Pope Gregory XIII in which he expressed his interest in establishing union with Rome. In 1591, Pilate became patriarch of Antioch and assumed the name Ignatius. He ordained his brother ʿAbd al-Ghani as a deputy metropolitan and then maphrian. However, from 1591 Pilate was opposed by Hidayat Allah, with the support of his uncle Timothy Tuma (d. 1592), until they were reconciled by John Wanki in 1593. He died in 1597 at Aleppo, where he was buried.

== Works ==
In 1560, Pilate transcribed a Beth Gazo whilst he was still a monk. He also produced a copy of The Book of Rays (Syriac: Kthobo d-Zalge) by Bar Hebraeus, dated 1590 (Oxford MS 521).

== Bibliography ==
- Barsoum, Aphrem (2003). The Scattered Pearls: A History of Syriac Literature and Sciences. Translated by Matti Moosa (2nd ed.). Gorgias Press.
- Barsoum, Aphrem (2008). History of the Za'faran Monastery. Translated by Matti Moosa. Gorgias Press.
- Bcheiry, Iskandar (2004). "A List of the Syrian Orthodox Patriarchs between 16th and 18th Century: A Historical Supplement to Michael the Syrian's Chronicle in a MS. of Sadad". Parole de l'Orient. 29: 211–261.
- Burleson, Samuel; Rompay, Lucas van (2011). "List of Patriarchs of the Main Syriac Churches in the Middle East". Gorgias Encyclopedic Dictionary of the Syriac Heritage. Piscataway, NJ: Gorgias Press. pp. 481–491.
- Snelders, Bas (2011). "Behnam, Dayro d-Mor". Gorgias Encyclopedic Dictionary of the Syriac Heritage. Piscataway, NJ: Gorgias Press. pp. 66–68.
- Takahashi, Hidemi (2011). "Aleppo". Gorgias Encyclopedic Dictionary of the Syriac Heritage. Piscataway, NJ: Gorgias Press. pp. 14–16.
- Wilmshurst, David (2019). "West Syrian patriarchs and maphrians". In Daniel King (ed.). The Syriac World. Routledge. pp. 806–813.

Preceded by Basil ʿAbd al-Ghani I	Syriac Orthodox Maphrian of the East; 1575/1576–1591	Succeeded by Basil ʿAbd al-Ghani II
Preceded by Ignatius David II Shah	Syriac Orthodox Patriarch of Antioch; 1591–1597	Succeeded by Ignatius Hidayat Allah
