= Patriarchal Vicariate of Zahle =

Patriarchal Vicariate of Zahle and Bekaa

Syriac Orthodox Church
- Incumbent: Yostinos Paulos Safar
- Style: Archbishop His Eminence

The Patriarchal Vicariate of Zahle and Bekaa is a nominally Metropolitan Archeparchy of the Syriac Orthodox Church. The incumbent metropolitan of Zahle and Bekaa is Mor Yostinos Paulos Safar.

== History ==
Syriac Orthodox Christians took refuge at Zahle after the Hamidian massacres in 1895–1896 and the Sayfo. The Church of Mar Jirjis (Saint George) at Zahle was consecrated in 1925. Zahle was made part of the Syriac Orthodox Archdiocese of Beirut and Damascus in 1933. A school was added to the Church of Saint George at Zahle in 1934. St Ephraim's Seminary at Zahle began construction in 1934 and was opened on 29 March 1939. It was moved to Mosul in Iraq in 1946. St Ephraim's Seminary was returned to Zahle in 1962 by Patriarch Ignatius Yaq'ub III and remained until it was moved again to Atshanneh in 1968. The Patriarchal Vicariate of Zahle and Bekaa was created in 1970. It was united with the Syriac Orthodox Archdiocese of Beirut in 1980. The Patriarchal Vicariate of Zahle and Bekaa was re-established in 1998. There were 2 clergy at Zahle by 2005. The Church of Saint Mary at Zahle was heavily damaged by a bomb on 27 March 2011.

== Ecclesiastical properties ==
The following ecclesiastical properties belong to the archdiocese:

- Church of Saint George, Zahle
- Church of Saint Mary, Zahle

== List of bishops ==
The following is a list of incumbents of the see:

- Severius Saliba Touma (2000–2004)
- Yostinos Paulos Safar (2005–present)

== Bibliography ==
- Chaillot, Christine (1998). The Syrian Orthodox Church of Antioch and All the East: A Brief Introduction to Its Life and Spirituality.
- Dinno, Khalid S. (2017). The Syrian Orthodox Christians in the Late Ottoman Period and Beyond: Crisis then Revival. Gorgias Press.
- Fiey, Jean Maurice (1993). Pour un Oriens Christianus Novus: Répertoire des diocèses syriaques orientaux et occidentaux (in French).
- Joseph, John (1983). Muslim-Christian Relations and Inter-Christian Rivalries in the Middle East: The Case of the Jacobites in an Age of Transition. SUNY Press.
