= Church of Saint Thomas, Mosul =

Syriac Orthodox Church in Mosul, Iraq

Church of Saint Thomas
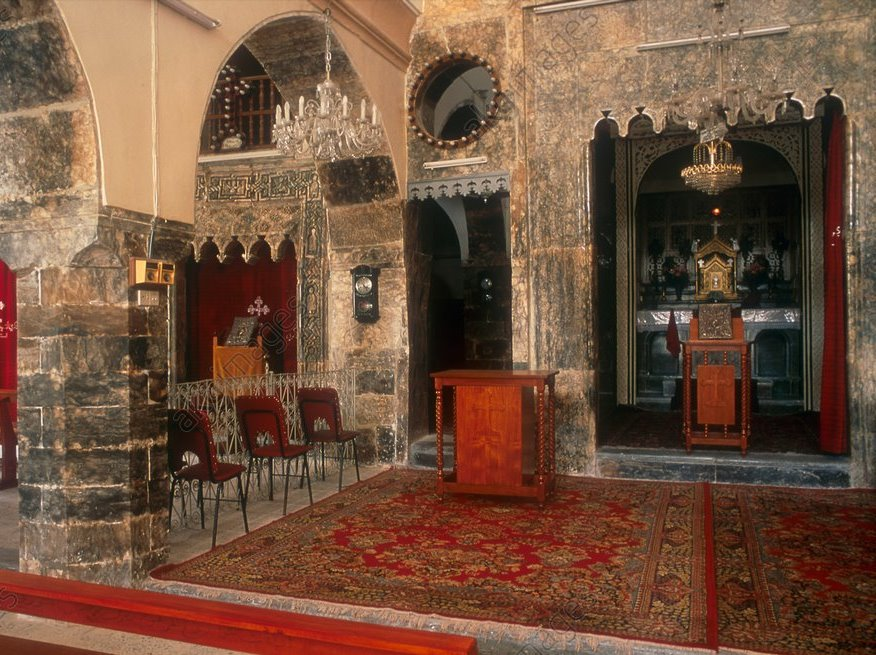

Religion
- Affiliation: Syriac Orthodox

Location
- Location: Mosul, Iraq
- Interactive map of Church of Saint Thomas
- Coordinates: 36°20′27″N 43°07′31.5″E

Architecture
- Type: Church

The Church of Saint Thomas is a Syriac Orthodox church in Mosul, Iraq.

== History ==
The church is dedicated to Saint Thomas the Apostle and is believed to have been constructed on the site of the house that the saint resided in during his stay in Mosul. The church is first mentioned in 770 as part of a grievance to Caliph Al-Mahdi. The current structure suggests it was built in the 13th century. The church was damaged during Shahanshah Nader Shah's siege of Mosul as part of the Ottoman–Persian War of 1743–1746, and was subsequently renovated in 1744 by Cyril George, metropolitan bishop of Hattakh, with the permission of the Ottoman Sultan Mahmud I. It was later renovated again in 1848.

Amidst restoration work in 1964, the finger bones of Saint Thomas were discovered in the church. On 23 December 2009, a bomb damaged the church, killed two men and injured five people. In the aftermath of the Fall of Mosul, the relics of Saint Thomas were taken from the church by Nicodemus Daoud Sharaf, Syriac Orthodox Archbishop of Mosul, and transferred to the Monastery of Saint Matthew on 17 June 2014. The church was used as a prison by Islamic State insurgents until the city's liberation in 2017.

== Burials ==
- Ignatius Isaac II, Syriac Orthodox patriarch of Antioch (r. 1709–1723)
- Basil Matthew II, Syriac Orthodox maphrian of the East (r. 1713–1727)
- Basil Lazarus IV, Syriac Orthodox maphrian of the East (r. 1730–1759)
- Cyril Rizq Allah, Syriac Orthodox metropolitan bishop of Mosul (r. 1760–1772)
- Cyril 'Abd al-'Aziz, Syriac Orthodox metropolitan bishop of Mosul (r. 1782–1816)

== Bibliography ==
- Barsoum, Aphrem (2009a). History of the Syriac Dioceses. Vol. 1. Translated by Matti Moosa. Gorgias Press.
- Barsoum, Aphrem (2009b). The Collected Historical Essays of Aphram I Barsoum. Vol. 1. Translated by Matti Moosa. Gorgias Press.
- Hann, Geoff; Dabrowska, Karen; Townsend Greaves, Tina (2015). Iraq: The ancient sites and Iraqi Kurdistan. Bradt Travel Guides. ISBN 9781841624884.
- Ignatius Jacob III (2008). History of the Monastery of Saint Matthew in Mosul. Translated by Matti Moosa. Gorgias Press.
