= Matthew the Hermit =

4th-century Syrian saint

Saint Matthew the Hermit
- Venerated in: Syriac Orthodox Church, Oriental Orthodox church
- Major shrine: Monastery of St. Matthew, Iraq
- Feast: 18 September

Saint Matthew the Hermit (Arabic: القديس مار متى الناسك; Syriac: ܡܪܝ ܡܬܝ Mor Mattai) was a 4th-century Christian priest. He is venerated as a saint in the Syriac Orthodox Church. His feast day is on the 18th of September.

== Biography ==
Matthew was born in the early 4th century in a village north of Amida, into a Christian family. He was educated at the Monastery of the Saints Sergius and Bacchus for seven years, after which he became a monk at the Monastery of Zuqnin and was ordained as a priest. Upon the ascension of Emperor Julian the Apostate in 361, and subsequent persecution of Christianity, Matthew and other monks fled to the Sasanian Empire, and took up residence on Mount Alfaf. Matthew practised asceticism in a cave on the mountain and gained renown as a miracle-worker. Having received a dream in which an angel instructed him to seek Matthew, Behnam, son of King Sinharib of Assur, met with the saint and discussed Christianity together. Aware of Matthew's reputation as a miracle-worker, the prince requested he join him on his return to Assur and heal his sister Sarah of leprosy, to which he agreed.

Matthew met with Behnam and Sarah outside of the city of Assur and healed her affliction. Behnam, Sarah, and forty slaves subsequently converted to Christianity and the saint baptised them. Following this, Matthew returned to his cave on Mount Alfaf. Sinharib discovered his children's conversion and the group suffered martyrdom as they attempted to flee to Matthew on Mount Alfaf. The king became afflicted with madness and was brought to the place of the martyrs' death by Behnam's mother. Matthew met Sinharib and the queen here and healed the king of his madness. They returned to Assur and the saint baptised Sinharib and his wife, and, at the request of Matthew, the king constructed a monastery on Mount Alfaf, which later became known as the Monastery of St. Matthew. Matthew resided at the monastery until his death and was buried there.

== Bibliography ==
- Radner, Karen (2015). Ancient Assyria: A Very Short Introduction. Oxford University Press. ISBN 9780198715900.
- Rassam, Suha (2005). Christianity in Iraq: Its Origins and Development to the Present Day. Gracewing Publishing. ISBN 9780852446331.
