= Ignatius George II =

106th Patriarch of the Syriac Orthodox Church of Antioch (1687–1708)

- Syriac Orthodox Patriarch of Antioch and All the East
- Church: Syriac Orthodox Church
- See: Antioch
- Installed: 1687
- Term ended: 1708
- Predecessor: Ignatius Abdulmasih I
- Successor: Ignatius Isaac II

Personal details
- Born: 1648 Mosul, Ottoman Empire
- Died: 5 June 1708 (aged 59–60)

Ignatius George II was the Patriarch of Antioch and head of the Syriac Orthodox Church from 1687 until his death in 1708. (Note: Also known as Ignatius Giwargis II or Ignatius Jirjis II. (Arabic: البطريرك جرجس الثاني ابن عبدالكريم الموصلي; Syriac: ܓܘܪܓܝܣ ܬܪܝܢܐ). The patriarchate of Ignatius George II is alternatively placed in 1686–1708.)

== Biography ==
George was born at Mosul in 1648, and was the son of ‘Abd al-Karim. He had a brother named Rizq Allah and a sister called Maryam, who had several sons, Isaac, Matthew, and Jacob. George became a monk at the nearby Mar Mattai Monastery, where he and his nephew Isaac were ordained as priests in 1669 by Basil Yeldo, Maphrian of the East. In 1673, George and Isaac aided Basil Yeldo in renovating the Mar Mattai Monastery, for which the three of them were imprisoned by the governor of Mosul for a short while. In 1677, he was ordained as metropolitan of Jazirat Ibn ʿUmar by Basil Yeldo, upon which he assumed the name Dioscorus.

After the abdication of Basil Yeldo, George was ordained as his successor as Maphrian of the East by Patriarch Ignatius Abdulmasih I in 1684, upon which he assumed the name Basil. (Note: George was appointed as maphrian in either 1683, or 1684.) He was elected to succeed Ignatius Abdulmasih I as patriarch of Antioch, and was consecrated at the Church of the Forty Martyrs at Mardin on 22 or 23 April 1687 (AG 1998). George assumed the name Ignatius, and received a firman from the Ottoman government thereby recognising his ascension to the patriarchal office. In the same year, he ordained his nephew Isaac as Maphrian of the East, and entrusted him with the authority to administrate the whole church. In George's tenure as patriarch, he undertook an effort to revitalise the church and to defend it against the inroads of the Syriac Catholic Church, which had seceded from the Syriac Orthodox Church. After having spent a year in the courts at Aleppo in Syria, George recovered control over churches that had been seized by Syriac Catholics. In Aleppo itself, he retook the Mar Assia al-Hakim Church more than once, and consecrated the Holy Chrism in the city in 1691.

He rebuilt a church at Amid in 1693 (AG 2004), as well as the churches of Edessa in the 1690s, Jazirat Ibn ʿUmar, and Mosul. In addition to this, he also renovated the Mor Hananyo Monastery by rebuilding its eastern wall, parts of the northern wall, and the monastic cells. (Note: The reconstruction of the Mor Hananyo Monastery is placed in 1697 (AG 2008) or 1699.) In 1696–1699, George rebuilt parts of the Church of the Virgin at the Mor Hananyo Monastery, atop of which he constructed the patriarchal chapel dedicated to Saint Peter, where he intended synods to meet to elect a new patriarch. In c. 1701, George constructed a church at Ḥisn Manṣūr, and also at Zakho. After the death of the Syriac Catholic patriarch Ignatius Gregory Peter VI Shahbaddin in early 1702, George visited Aleppo and convinced most of the Catholic converts to return to the Syriac Orthodox Church. He visited Edessa in c. 1702 or 1703, where he was imprisoned for a time due to conflict with Syriac Catholics there. At Mardin, he rebuilt the Church of the Forty Martyrs, the Church of Mār Šemʿūn, and the Church of Mār Mīḫāʿīl in 1704 (AG 2015).

George assisted Basilius Gurgis, metropolitan of Bushairiyya, with the construction of the Monastery of Mor Quryaqos with bishops ʿAbd al-Aḥad of Jerusalem and Giwargi of Edessa. In 1708, in response to the outbreak of plague at Mardin and Amida, George led a procession of Christians of mixed confessions from Mardin to the nearby Monastery of Mār Yaʿqōb to pray for deliverance, and delivered a sermon, in which the patriarch preached that the plague was sent by God to punish those who had converted to Catholicism. George served as patriarch until his death on 5 June 1708 (AG 2019), and he was buried at the Mor Hananyo Monastery. In a biography of George written in 1730 in Arabic by Timothy ’Isa, metropolitan of the Mor Hananyo Monastery, he is credited with several miracles. As patriarch, he consecrated twenty bishops.

== Episcopal succession ==
As patriarch, George ordained the following bishops:

1. Basil Isaac, Maphrian of the East (1687)
2. Dioscorus Saliba, bishop of the Jazira (1691)
3. Gregorius Yaqub, metropolitan of Gargar (1692)
4. Gregorius Shim’un (Simon), metropolitan of Jerusalem (1693)
5. Severus Ibrahim, metropolitan of Edessa (1694)
6. Cyril Bishara, bishop of the Monastery of Mar Julian and Hama (1695)
7. Cyril Yeshu’, metropolitan of Bitlis (1697)
8. Ishaq (Isaac) Saliba, metropolitan of the Monastery of Mar Abai (1697)
9. Dionysius Yusuf, metropolitan of Ma’dan (1701)
10. Iyawannis Matta, metropolitan of the Mar Mattai Monastery (1701)
11. Dionysius Yuhanna (John), metropolitan of the Mor Hananyo Monastery (1702)
12. Yuhanna (John), bishop of the Monastery of Qatra (1704)
13. Basilius ‘Abd al-Ahad, bishop of Zarjal (1705)
14. Gregorius ‘Abd al-Azali, bishop of Damascus (1706)
15. Basilius Ibrahim, bishop of Bushairiyya (1706)
16. Athanasius Aslan, metropolitan of the Patriarchal Office (1707)
17. Julius Zmaria, bishop of the Monastery of Mar Julian (1707)
18. Basilius Gurgis, metropolitan of Bushairiyya (1707)
19. Severus Iliyya (Elijah), metropolitan of Edessa (1707)
20. Dioscorus, bishop of the Monastery of Mar Musa (c. 1708)

== Bibliography ==
- Barsoum, Aphrem (2008). History of the Za'faran Monastery. Translated by Matti Moosa. Gorgias Press.
- Barsoum, Aphrem (2009). History of the Syriac Dioceses. Vol. 1. Translated by Matti Moosa. Gorgias Press.
- Bcheiry, Iskandar (2004). "A List of the Syrian Orthodox Patriarchs between 16th and 18th Century: A Historical Supplement to Michael the Syrian's Chronicle in a MS. of Sadad". Parole de l'Orient. 29: 211–261.
- Burleson, Samuel; Rompay, Lucas van (2011). "List of Patriarchs of the Main Syriac Churches in the Middle East". Gorgias Encyclopedic Dictionary of the Syriac Heritage. Piscataway, NJ: Gorgias Press. pp. 481–491.
- Ignatius Jacob III (2008). History of the Monastery of Saint Matthew in Mosul. Translated by Matti Moosa. Gorgias Press.
- Joseph, John (1983). Muslim-Christian Relations and Inter-Christian Rivalries in the Middle East: The Case of the Jacobites in an Age of Transition. State University of New York Press.
- Kiraz, George A. (2011a). "Baselios Gewargis". In Sebastian P. Brock; Aaron M. Butts; George A. Kiraz; Lucas Van Rompay (eds.). Gorgias Encyclopedic Dictionary of the Syriac Heritage. Gorgias Press. p. 64.
- Kiraz, George A. (2011b). "Giwargis II, Ignatius". In Sebastian P. Brock; Aaron M. Butts; George A. Kiraz; Lucas Van Rompay (eds.). Gorgias Encyclopedic Dictionary of the Syriac Heritage. Gorgias Press. p. 178.
- Kiraz, George A. (2011c). "Isḥoq ʿAzar". In Sebastian P. Brock; Aaron M. Butts; George A. Kiraz; Lucas Van Rompay (eds.). Gorgias Encyclopedic Dictionary of the Syriac Heritage. Gorgias Press. p. 217.
- Wilmshurst, David (2000). The Ecclesiastical Organisation of the Church of the East, 1318–1913 (PDF). Peeters Publishers.
- Wilmshurst, David (2019). "West Syrian patriarchs and maphrians". In Daniel King (ed.). The Syriac World. Routledge. pp. 806–813.

Preceded by Basil Yeldo	Syriac Orthodox Maphrian of the East; 1684–1686	Succeeded by Basil Isaac
Preceded by Ignatius Abdulmasih I	Syriac Orthodox Patriarch of Antioch; 1687–1708	Succeeded by Ignatius Isaac II
