= Ignatius Simon =

103rd Patriarch of the Syriac Orthodox Church of Antioch (1640–1653)

- Syriac Orthodox Patriarch of Antioch and All the East
- Church: Syriac Orthodox Church
- See: Antioch
- Installed: 1640
- Term ended: 1653
- Predecessor: Ignatius Hidayat Allah
- Successor: Ignatius Yeshu II

Personal details
- Died: 1660 Amid, Ottoman Empire

Ignatius Simon was the Patriarch of Antioch and head of the Syriac Orthodox Church from 1640 until 1653. (Note: Also known as Ignatius Sham‘un, Ignatius Shemʿon I, Ignatius Shemʿun, and Ignatius Shimun I.)

== Biography ==
Simon was from Anhil in Tur Abdin and became patriarch of Antioch in 1640. He was opposed by Yeshu, bishop of Amid, who proclaimed himself as patriarch of Antioch as Ignatius Yeshu II, and Simon was banished to Cyprus. (Note: Barsoum places Yeshu's ascension in December 1652 whereas Wilmshurst and Burleson & Rompay give 1653.) Upon Simon's return from exile, he absolved Yeshu.

As a consequence of the success of Catholic missionaries amongst the Syriac Orthodox community of Aleppo, it was then hoped that they could convince the patriarch to install a Catholic as archbishop of Aleppo. Simon agreed to appoint a Catholic convert, Abdul Ghal Akhijan, as archbishop of Aleppo after he had been invited to dinner twice by François Picquet, the French consul of Aleppo, and received promises that the consul would absorb some of his debts. Akhijan was subsequently consecrated as a Maronite bishop by the Maronite patriarch of Antioch, Hanna al-Safrawi, in 1656, as it was deemed inappropriate for the Syriac Orthodox patriarch to conduct the ceremony.

It had been intended that Akhijan would then be appointed as the archbishop of Aleppo by Simon, however, Akhijan was rejected by both the Syriac Orthodox community of Aleppo, who refused to accept a Maronite as bishop, and Simon, who was offended that the Maronite patriarch had been asked to consecrate one of his bishops. Despite François Picquet's efforts to convince Simon over dinner at the consular residence, he refused to acknowledge Akhijan and thus Picquet secured a firman from Sultan Mehmed IV in which Akhijan was officially recognised as the archbishop of Aleppo. Violence broke out between Syriac Catholics and Syriac Orthodox Christians and Simon fled Aleppo for Damascus soon after he learnt of the firman whilst Akhijan withdrew to Lebanon.

Although some historians identify Simon with an eastern bishop who visited Malabar in India in c. 1652 and was believed to have died there, he is addressed in a letter dated 21 December 1660 from Thoma I that was delivered by the deacon Stephen of Amid. He ordained ‘Abd al-Jalil as metropolitan of Amid in 1654 with the name Timothy to succeed the deceased metropolitan ‘Isa Nuwayyir. Simon died at Amid in 1660. He ordained three maphrians and seven bishops.

== Bibliography ==
- Barsoum, Aphrem (2008). The History of Tur Abdin. Translated by Matti Moosa. Gorgias Press.
- Bcheiry, Iskandar (2004). "A List of the Syrian Orthodox Patriarchs between 16th and 18th Century: A Historical Supplement to Michael the Syrian's Chronicle in a MS. of Sadad". Parole de l'Orient. 29: 211–261.
- Burleson, Samuel; Rompay, Lucas van (2011). "List of Patriarchs of the Main Syriac Churches in the Middle East". Gorgias Encyclopedic Dictionary of the Syriac Heritage. Piscataway, NJ: Gorgias Press. pp. 481–491.
- Dinno, Khalid S. (2017). The Syrian Orthodox Christians in the Late Ottoman Period and Beyond: Crisis then Revival. Gorgias Press.
- Ignatius Jacob III (2009). History of the Syrian Church of India. Translated by Matti Moosa. Gorgias Press.
- Joseph, John (1983). Muslim-Christian Relations and Inter-Christian Rivalries in the Middle East: The Case of the Jacobites in an Age of Transition. State University of New York Press.
- Wilmshurst, David (2019). "West Syrian patriarchs and maphrians". In Daniel King (ed.). The Syriac World. Routledge. pp. 806–813.
- Winkler, Dietmar W. (2019). "The Syriac Church denominations: An overview". In Daniel King (ed.). The Syriac World. Routledge. pp. 119–133.

Preceded by Ignatius Hidayat Allah	Syriac Orthodox Patriarch of Antioch; 1640–1653	Succeeded by Ignatius Yeshu II
