= Basil Matthew II =

90th Maphrian of the East of Syriac Orthodox Church of Antioch

- Syriac Orthodox Maphrian of the East
- Church: Syriac Orthodox Church
- Installed: 1713
- Term ended: 1727
- Predecessor: Basil Lazarus III
- Successor: Basil Simon
- Previous post: Archbishop of the Monastery of Saint Matthew

Personal details
- Born: Mosul
- Died: September 1727

Basil Matthew II was the Syriac Orthodox Maphrian of the East from 1713 until his death in 1727.

== Biography ==
Matthew was born at Mosul in the 17th century, and was the son of Maqdisi Lazarus. He had a brother named Isaac. Matthew became a monk at the nearby monastery of Saint Matthew before 1672, and was later ordained as archbishop of the monastery of Saint Matthew by his uncle, Patriarch Ignatius George II in 1701, upon which he assumed the name Iyawannis. Matthew's brother Isaac, who had become Maphrian of the East, also participated in his ordination. In the same year as his ordination as archbishop, Matthew planted a garden (Junayna) at the monastery of Saint Matthew and paved the road to Bar Hebraeus' cell, for which an inscription in Syriac was added to the garden wall and also to the tomb of Saint Matthew to commemorate the work.

As archbishop, Matthew deputised for his brother Isaac in administering the diocese of Mosul. After the death of Basil Lazarus III, Matthew was ordained as Maphrian of the East by his brother Patriarch Ignatius Isaac II at the Monastery of Saint Ananias before September 1713, upon which he assumed the name Basil. Matthew served as Maphrian of the East until his death in September 1727, and he was buried with Isaac in his tomb at the Church of Saint Thomas at Mosul.

== Bibliography ==
- Barsoum, Aphrem (2009). History of the Syriac Dioceses. Vol. 1. Translated by Matti Moosa. Gorgias Press.
- Ignatius Jacob III (2008). History of the Monastery of Saint Matthew in Mosul. Translated by Matti Moosa. Gorgias Press.

Preceded by Basil Lazarus III	Syriac Orthodox Maphrian of the East; 1713–1727	Succeeded by Basil Simon
