= Syriac Orthodox Archdiocese of Mount Lebanon =

Archdiocese of Mount Lebanon and Tripoli

Syriac Orthodox Church
- Incumbent; Chrysostomos Mikhael Chamoun
- Style: Archbishop His Eminence

The Syriac Orthodox Archdiocese of Mount Lebanon and Tripoli is a nominally Metropolitan Archeparchy of the Syriac Orthodox Church in Lebanon. It serves Mount Lebanon, Tripoli, and the South Governorate. The incumbent metropolitan of Mount Lebanon and Tripoli is Mor Chrysostomos Mikhael Chamoun.

== History ==
Ishoʿ, bishop of Tripoli, also known as Bar Parson of Edessa, is mentioned in c. 1252 in the Ecclesiastical Chronicle of Barhebraeus. Philoxenus George ibn Qaraman was metropolitan of Hardine, Hama, and Tripoli in 1483–1504. Tripoli is also attested as a diocese under Patriarch Ignatius Noah of Lebanon (r. 1494–1509) with the bishops Philoxenus George and Cyril. Tripoli was included in the title of Gregorius Joseph Kurdji, metropolitan of Jerusalem in 1510–1537, and John of Karkar, metropolitan of Jerusalem (d. 1587). Balamand Monastery was reportedly Syriac Orthodox until 1603.

In the aftermath of the Sayfo, most of the Syriac Orthodox Christians at Adana took refuge at Tripoli in 1919. The Church of Saint Ephrem at Tripoli was built in 1958. The archdiocese was created in 1973 by Patriarch Ignatius Ya'qub III. (Note: According to Fiey, the archdiocese was established in 1980.) It was carved out of the Archdiocese of Beirut. The Church of Saint Jacob of Serugh at Bushriye was built with episcopal offices by Theophilus George Saliba, metropolitan of Mount Lebanon and Tripoli, in 1983. By 1998, most of the Syriac Orthodox Christians in Lebanon lived in the archdiocese of Mount Lebanon and Tripoli. The archdiocese had 5 clergy in 2005, including 4 at Bushriye and 1 at Tripoli.

== Ecclesiastical properties ==
The following ecclesiastical properties belong to the archdiocese:

- Church of Saint Jacob of Serugh, Bushriye.
- Church of Saint Ephrem, Tripoli.
- Church of Saint Mary, Bourj Hammoud.
- Church of Saint Gabriel, Ajaltoun.

== List of archbishops ==
The following is a list of incumbents of the see:

- Theophilus George Saliba (1981–2023)
- Chrysostomos Mikhael Chamoun (2023–present)

== Bibliography ==
- Barsoum, Ephrem (2003). The Scattered Pearls: A History of Syriac Literature and Sciences. Translated by Matti Moosa (2nd ed.). Gorgias Press.
- Chaillot, Christine (1998). The Syrian Orthodox Church of Antioch and All the East: A Brief Introduction to Its Life and Spirituality.
- Dinno, Khalid S. (2017). The Syrian Orthodox Christians in the Late Ottoman Period and Beyond: Crisis then Revival. Gorgias Press.
- Fiey, Jean Maurice (1993). Pour un Oriens Christianus Novus: Répertoire des diocèses syriaques orientaux et occidentaux (in French).
- Wilmshurst, David (2016). Bar Hebraeus The Ecclesiastical Chronicle: An English Translation. Gorgias Press.
