= Baselios Yeldo =

Syriac bishop and saint (1593–1685)

Saint Baselios Yeldo
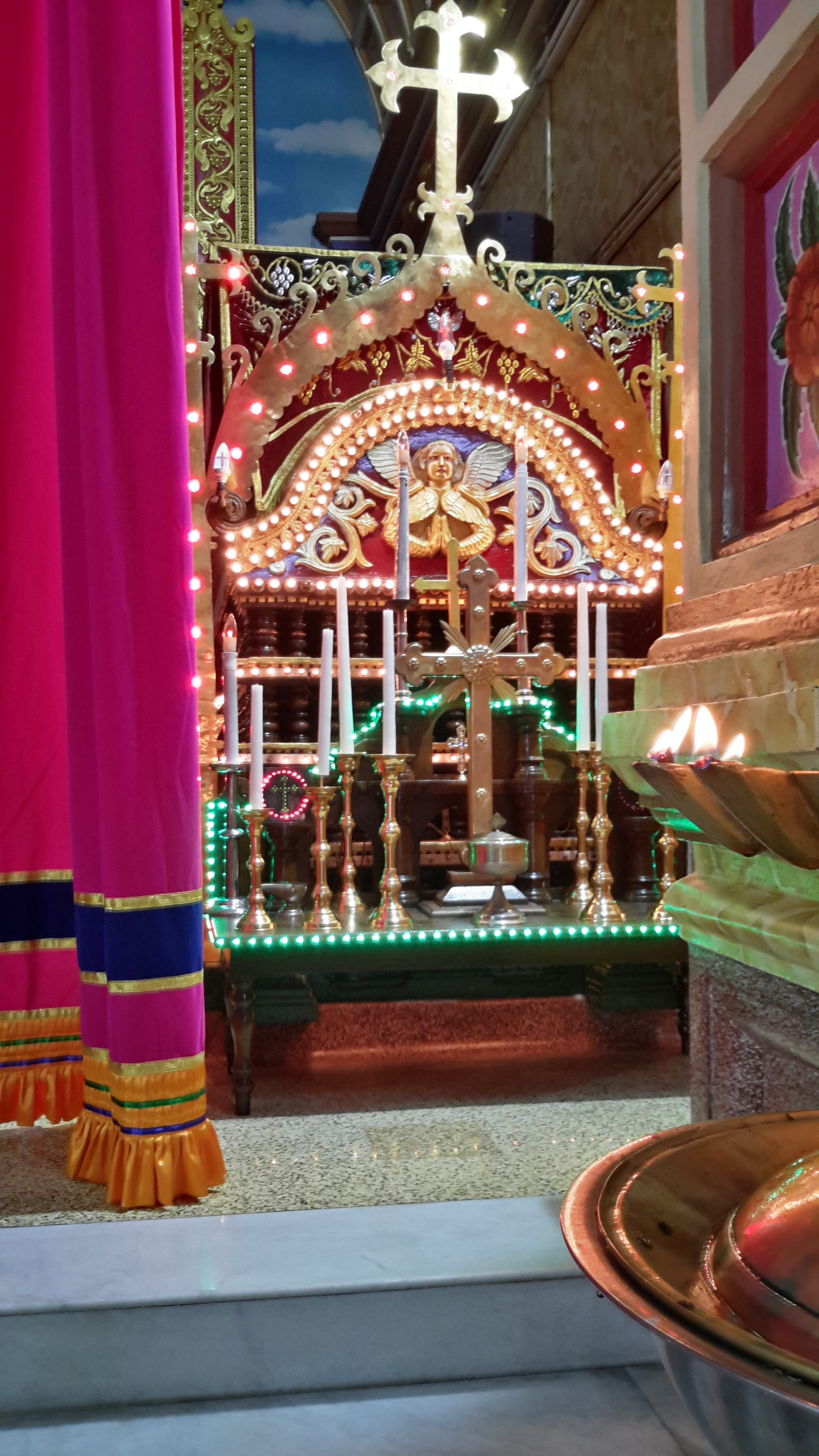
- Tomb of Mor Baselios Yeldo. (No picture or icon of the saint presently available)

Maphrian of the East
- Born: 1593; Bakhdida, Ottoman Empire
- Died: 29 September 1685; Kothamangalam
- Venerated in: Jacobite Syriac Orthodox Church And; Oriental Orthodox Christianity
- Canonized: 20 October 1987 by H.H Mor Ignatius Zakka I Iwas, Patriarch of Antioch and Supreme Head of Universal Syriac Orthodox Church
- Major shrine: St. Thomas Church, Kothamangalam
- Feast: 3 October

Saint Baselios Yeldo (യൽദോ മാർ ബസ്സേലിയോസ് ബാവ) was the Maphrian of the East of the Syriac Orthodox Church from 1678 until his resignation in 1684. He is venerated as a saint in the Jacobite Syrian Orthodox Church and his feast day is 3 October. His tomb is situated in Marthoman Cheriyapally, Kothamangalam and feast is celebrated as Kanni 20th perunnal (കന്നി 20 പെരുന്നാൾ) which gather many pilgrims to the Tomb.

Yeldo was proclaimed as a saint, canonised by Ignatius Zakka I Iwas, Syriac Orthodox Patriarch of Antioch, on 20 October 1987

== Biography ==
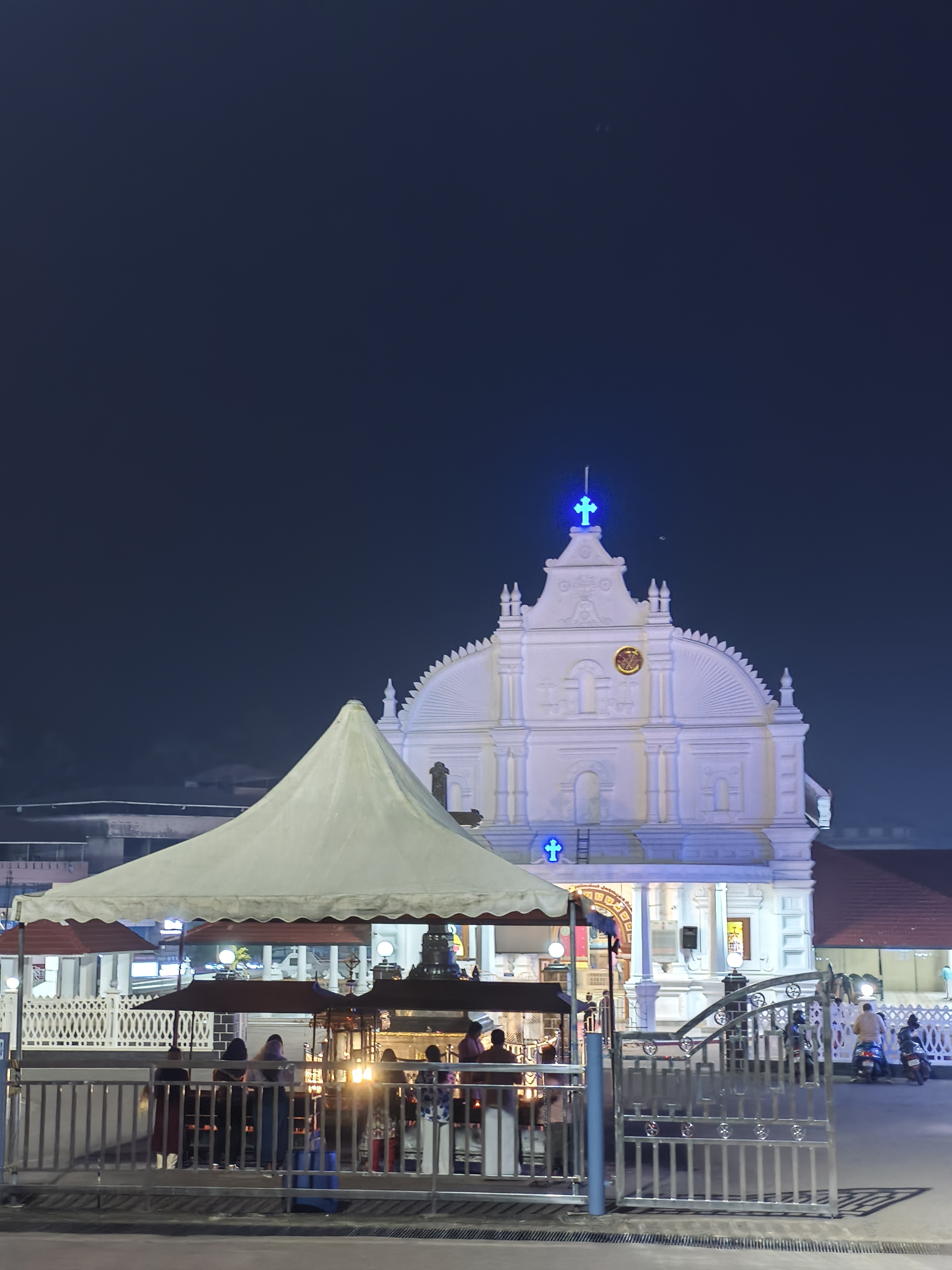
Night View of Marthoman Cheriyapally, Kothamangalam

Yeldo was born in 1593 in the village of Bakhdida, near the city of Mosul, and became a monk at the Monastery of Saint Behnam at a young age. He was consecrated Maphrian of the East in 1678 by Mor Ignatius Abdul Messiah I, the then Syriac Orthodox Patriarch of Antioch.

In 1683, Mor Ignatius Abdul Messiah I, the then Patriarch of Antioch, received a letter and later a delegation from Mar Thoma II, the then Archbishop of Malankara, requesting clergymen to help against Portuguese colonial attempts to subdue the Church of Malankara. The patriarch met with clergymen at the Monastery of Saint Ananias in the following year to discuss the state of the Church of Malankara and decide whom to send, and Mor Yeldo volunteered to travel to Malankara and thus resign as Maphrian. The patriarch and others expressed concern at the health and age of the saint, however, the patriarch granted Mor Yeldo permission to undertake the journey. He returned to the Monastery of Saint Matthew and made preparations for the journey to India. The monks Joea and Matthew, from the monasteries of Saint Matthew and Saint Behnam respectively, Bishop Mor Ivanios Hidyatullah, and Yeldo's brother Jamma joined him on the journey south to Basra.

The group travelled by sea from Basra to Thalassery via Surat, arriving in 1685, but due to the threat of the Portuguese colonialists and pirates, Yeldo and his entourage decided to continue their journey to Malakhachira (literally, "Place of the Angel", i.e. present Kothamangalam) by land and in disguise. Whilst travelling, the group encountered a tiger, but was repelled when Mor Yeldo made the sign of the cross in its direction, forcing it to flee. He later arrived at the village of Pallivasal and, with the knowledge a heavy flood would afflict the village in the night, advised the villagers to sleep in the hills. Those who followed the saint and his entourage into the hills survived whilst the animals and villagers who remained were drowned. Mor Ivanios and Mor Yeldo continued on to Kozhippilli, near Kothamangalam, where Mor Ivanios agreed to hide in a tree until Mor Yeldo returned, as it was deemed unsafe to travel together.

He later reached the River Periyar and asked a local man belonging to the Nair community who was tending his cattle to show him to the local St. Thomas Church, Kothamangalam. The man stated he could not do so due to his inability to leave his cattle alone, and thus Mor Yeldo drew a circle in the dirt with his walking stick and instructed the man to direct the cattle into the circle. The cattle consequently did not leave the circle, and the man told the saint of his sister's labour pains, to which Mor Yeldo asked for water. The man went to climb a coconut tree, but it bent down by itself, and he gathered two coconuts. Mor Yeldo blessed one of the coconuts and told the man to make his sister drink from the coconut. The man later returned with the news that his sister had successfully given birth to a baby boy. As the cattle had remained within the circle, the man agreed to show Mor Yeldo to the local church. In remembrance of this event, his successors, belonging to the Nair community, hold the traditional lamp of the church and lead the Rasa (Church procession) on the festival day of Mor Baselios Yeldo to date.

At the St. Thomas Church, members of the local congregation returned to Kozhippilli with Mor Yeldo's handkerchief to retrieve Mor Ivanios who, however, refused to come down from the tree as he believed that the crowd had murdered the saint. The local deacon, who spoke Syriac, showed the bishop the handkerchief and convinced him to come with them to Kothamangalam. At Kothamangalam, on the Feast of the Holy Cross, Mor Yeldo consecrated Mor Ivanios Hidayatullah as archbishop to help consecrate clergy and thus combat Portuguese affronts against the Church of Malankara. Due to his age, however, the saint became ill three days later and died on 29 September 1685. The huge granite cross within the Church of Saint Thomas lit up at the time of his death.

Preceded by Habeeb II	Syriac Orthodox Maphrian of the East; 1678–1684	Succeeded by Ignatius George II
