= Syriac Orthodox Archdiocese of Beirut and Damascus =

Syriac Orthodox Church History

Syriac orthodox Church
- Incumbent none
- Style: Archbishop His Eminence

Information
- Established: in 1933

The Syriac Orthodox Archdiocese of Beirut and Damascus was nominally Metropolitan Archeparchy of the Syriac Orthodox Church.

== History ==
Under Mor Yohanna Kandur the seat was St. Peter and St. Paul Cathedral in Beirut, Lebanon. With the consecration of Mor Severus Jacob as Patriarch of the Syriac Orthodox Church, the seat moved to Cathedral of Saint George, Damascus, Syria.

== List of bishops ==
- Mor Yohanna Kandur (1933 - 1950) consecrated by Ignatius Elias III.
- Mor Severus Jacob (1950 -1957) consecrated by Ignatius Aphrem I.

== Current juridictions ==
Succeeded by:

- Syriac Orthodox Archdiocese of Beirut
- Syriac Orthodox Patriarchal Archdiocese of Damascus

== See also ==
- Syriac Orthodox dioceses
