= Behnam, Sarah, and the Forty Martyrs =

4th-century Assyrian Christians

Saints Behnam, Sarah, and the Forty Martyrs
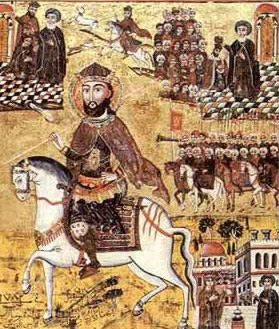
- An icon of Saints Behnam, Sarah, and the Forty Martyrs in the Coptic Museum.

Martyrs
- Venerated in: Oriental Orthodox Churches
- Major shrine: Mar Behnam Monastery, Iraq
- Feast: 10 January (Armenian Apostolic Church); 10 December (Syriac Orthodox Church); 23 December (Coptic Orthodox Church)

Saints Behnam, Sarah, and the Forty Martyrs were 4th-century Christians who suffered martyrdom during the reign of Zoroastrian King Shapur II. They are venerated as saints in the Oriental Orthodox Churches and their lives are described in writings known as the Persian martyr acts.

== Biography ==
According to their hagiography, Behnam and Sarah were the children of Sennacherib, King of Nimrud, who ruled under the Shahanshah Shapur II of Iran. (Note: Sennacherib is alternatively named as the king of Athor.) Behnam was separated from his companions during a hunting expedition and was forced to spend a night in a cave. An angel then visited Behnam and instructed him to see Saint Matthew the Hermit, who lived in a cave on Mount Alfaf. Behnam met with Matthew and was taught Christianity by the hermit. Behnam demanded proof and thus Matthew told him to bring Sarah to him to be healed of her leprosy.

Behnam and his entourage returned to the city and told his mother of his dream and the saint. His mother allowed Behnam and Sarah to return to the saint in secret, and he healed Sarah of her leprosy, after which Behnam, Sarah, and the forty slaves were baptised. Matthew used water from a spring that appeared after he hit the ground with his staff. The king learned of his children's conversion and threatened to punish them if they did not abandon Christianity. Stalwart in their faith, Behnam, Sarah, and the forty slaves, fled to Mount Alfaf, but were slain by soldiers sent by the king.

Sennacherib was afflicted by madness after the death of the martyrs. An angel appeared before Behnam's mother and told her the king would only be cured of his madness if he converted to Christianity and prayed at the site of the martyrs' death. Behnam's mother and Sennacherib followed the angel's instructions, and the king was cured. They were then baptised by Saint Matthew at Assur. At the request of Saint Matthew, Sennacherib constructed a monastery atop Mount Alfaf, that would later become known as the Mar Mattai Monastery. The king also constructed a monument on the site of the martyrs' death called gubba ("pit" in Syriac). A wealthy pilgrim called Isaac later visited the site of the martyrs' death in the hope it would exorcise the devil from his servant, and constructed a monastery named as Beth Gubbe near Behnam's tomb upon receiving instructions to do so from the saint in a dream. This became known as the Mar Behnam Monastery.

== Hagiography ==
The life of the martyrs is recorded in at least twenty Syriac manuscripts. The earliest surviving manuscript is named the History of Mar Behnam and Sarah. The German historian Gernot Wießner argued it was composed in Late Antiquity, but it has since been proven by more recent studies that it was written in 1197. It was written by an adherent of the Syriac Orthodox Church, and details of the saints' lives are also recorded in other Syriac manuscripts from the late 12th and early 13th centuries. The hagiography may have been written to establish the pre-Islamic foundation of the Monastery of Saints Behnam and Sarah, and thus prevent confiscation from Muslim rulers.

A mention of a church of Saint Behnam at Tripoli in 961 by Bar Hebraeus in his Chronography has been argued to suggest that an oral version of the saints' lives had existed prior to the earliest surviving manuscript. Two homilies (Syriac: mêmrê) on the martyrs named On the Martyrdom of Behnam and his Companions are known to have been written by Jacob of Serugh. The 15th century author Ignatius Behnam Hadloyo also wrote two poems on Behnam, of which five copies survive.

Names and places in the hagiography were derived from pre-existing traditions, as demonstrated by the name Sarah, which is known to be the traditional name given in Syriac hagiographies to the sister of a male martyr, such as the Saints Zayna and Sarah, and was derived from Sarah, wife of Abraham. Also, as a consequence of the Christianisation of Assyria, figures and sites from Assyrian history were integrated into Christian narratives, and thus Assur was mentioned as the place of the king's baptism, and the name Sennacherib used for Behnam and Sarah's father was inspired by the Assyrian king Sennacherib (r. 705 – 681 BC).

The French historian Jean Maurice Fiey noted that the Forty Martyrs of Bartella, the village near the monastery of Saints Behnam and Sarah in Iraq, are also commemorated on 10 December in the Martyrology of Rabban Sliba. Sarah is also separately commemorated in some Syriac Orthodox calendars on 22 November.

== Relics ==
The relics of Behnam and Sarah are kept at the Mar Behnam Monastery in Iraq. Some relics of the saints are also contained in the Monastery of Saint Menas in Cairo. As well as this, the Syriac Orthodox Church of the Forty Martyrs at Mardin in Turkey purports to contain the remains of Saint Behnam.

== Bibliography ==
- Barsoum, Aphrem (2003). The Scattered Pearls: A History of Syriac Literature and Sciences. Translated by Matti Moosa (2nd ed.). Gorgias Press.
- Chaillot, Christine (2006). "The Ancient Oriental Churches". In Geoffrey Wainwright; Karen B. Westerfield Tucker (eds.). The Oxford History of Christian Worship. Oxford University Press. pp. 131–170.
- Fiey, Jean Maurice (2004). Lawrence Conrad (ed.). Saints Syriaques (in French). The Darwin Press.
- Harrak, Amir (2001). "Tales about Sennacherib: The Contribution of the Syriac Sources". In P.M. Michèle Daviau; John W. Wevers; Michael Weigl (eds.). The World of the Aramaeans: Studies in Honour of Paul-Eugène Dion. Vol. 3. A&C Black. pp. 168–190.
- Meinardus, Otto Friedrich August (2002). Two Thousand Years of Coptic Christianity. American University in Cairo Press.
- Radner, Karen (2015). Ancient Assyria: A Very Short Introduction. Oxford University Press.
- Rassam, Suha (2005). Christianity in Iraq: Its Origins and Development to the Present Day. Gracewing Publishing.
- Saint-Laurent, Jeanne-Nicole Mellon (2019). "Christian Legend in Medieval Iraq: Siblings, Sacrifice, and Sanctity in Behnam and Sarah". In Georgia Frank; Susan Holman; Andrew Jacobs (eds.). The Garb of Being: Embodiment and the Pursuit of Holiness in Late Ancient Christianity. Fordham University Press. pp. 191–221.
- Sinclair, T.A. (1989). Eastern Turkey: An Architectural & Archaeological Survey, Volume III. Pindar Press. ISBN 9780907132349.
- Smith, Kyle (2016). Constantine and the Captive Christians of Persia: Martyrdom and Religious Identity in Late Antiquity. University of California Press.
- Wolper, Ethel Sara (2014). "Khidr and the Politics of Translation in Mosul: Mar Behnam, St George and Khidr Ilyas". In Gharipour Mohammad (ed.). Sacred Precincts: The Religious Architecture of Non-Muslim Communities Across the Islamic World. Brill. pp. 377–392.
