= Ignatius Yeshu II =

104th Patriarch of the Syriac Orthodox Church of Antioch (1653–1661)

Ignatuis Yeshu II
- Syriac Orthodox Patriarch of Antioch and All the East
- Church: Syriac Orthodox Church
- See: Antioch
- Installed: 1653
- Term ended: 1661
- Predecessor: Ignatius Simon
- Successor: Ignatius Abdulmasih I

Personal details
- Born: Amid, Ottoman Empire
- Died: 1661 Aleppo, Ottoman Empire

Ignatius Yeshu II was the Patriarch of Antioch and head of the Syriac Orthodox Church from 1653 until his death in 1661. (Note: Also known as Ignatius Ishoʿ II Qamsho, Ignatius Yeshuʿ II (IV) bar Qamsho, Yešū Qamšī, and Yeshu’ II bar Qamsha.)

== Biography ==
Yeshu was born at Amid and was the son of Abd al-Ahad of the Qamsha family, who were originally from Banim’am. He became a monk at the Monastery of Qartmin and was ordained as a priest. Yeshu took up writing and studied under Rabban Tuma of Khudayda. He later became bishop of Amid and proclaimed himself as patriarch of Antioch in opposition to Ignatius Simon, who was banished to Cyprus. (Note: Barsoum places Yeshu's ascension in December 1652 whereas Wilmshurst and Burleson & Rompay give 1653. According to Barsoum, Yeshu was ordained as Maphrian of the East.) Yeshu was absolved by Ignatius Simon following the latter's return from exile and, upon his death, Yeshu succeeded him as the legitimate patriarch in 1660, according to Aphrem Barsoum. Yeshu died at Aleppo in 1661.

== Bibliography ==
- Barsoum, Aphrem (2008). The History of Tur Abdin. Translated by Matti Moosa. Gorgias Press.
- Barsoum, Aphrem (2009). The Collected Historical Essays of Aphram I Barsoum. Vol. 1. Translated by Matti Moosa. Gorgias Press.
- Bcheiry, Iskandar (2004). "A List of the Syrian Orthodox Patriarchs between 16th and 18th Century: A Historical Supplement to Michael the Syrian's Chronicle in a MS. of Sadad". Parole de l'Orient. 29: 211–261.
- Burleson, Samuel; Rompay, Lucas van (2011). "List of Patriarchs of the Main Syriac Churches in the Middle East". Gorgias Encyclopedic Dictionary of the Syriac Heritage. Piscataway, NJ: Gorgias Press. pp. 481–491.
- Wilmshurst, David (2019). "West Syrian patriarchs and maphrians". In Daniel King (ed.). The Syriac World. Routledge. pp. 806–813.

| Preceded by Ignatius Simon | Syriac Orthodox Patriarch of Antioch; 1653–1661 | Succeeded by Ignatius Abdulmasih I |
