= Ignatius Hidayat Allah =

102nd Patriarch of the Syriac Orthodox Church of Antioch (1597–1639)

- Syriac Orthodox Patriarch of Antioch and All the East
- Church: Syriac Orthodox Church
- See: Antioch
- Installed: 1597/1598
- Term ended: 1639/1640
- Predecessor: Ignatius Pilate
- Successor: Ignatius Simon

Ignatius Hidayat Allah was the Patriarch of Antioch and head of the Syriac Orthodox Church from 1597/1598 until 1639/1640. (Note: Also known as Ignatius Hedaiat Alah, Ignatius Peter Ḥadoyo, Ignatius Ḥidayatallāh, or simply Hadāyā.) (Note: The patriarchate of Ignatius Hidayat Allah is placed in either 1597–1639, 1597–1640, 1598–1639, or 1598–1640.)

== Biography ==
Hidayat Allah was the son of Qūsṭanṭīn, son of Yūḥannā and Hissin. Through his father, Yūḥannā, son of Nūr al-Dīn and Muglah, Hidayat Allah was the nephew of the patriarchs Ignatius Ni'matallah (r. 1555–1576) and Ignatius David II Shah (r. 1576–1591). Hidayat Allah's paternal grandfather Nūr al-Dīn, son of Šay Allāh and Maryam, was a brother of the patriarch Ignatius John XIV (r. 1483–1493) Hidayat Allah's father's family had moved from Bartella, near Mosul, to Mardin in the mid-fourteenth century and were descended from the priest Abū al-Karam, who lived in the thirteenth or fourteenth centuries.

From 1591, he opposed the patriarch Ignatius Pilate with the support of his uncle Timothy Tuma until they were reconciled by John Wanki in 1593. Hidayat Allah became patriarch of Antioch in 1597 or 1598 and assumed the name Ignatius. In 1611, he visited the Monastery of Saint Mark at Jerusalem with Maphrian Elia, Bishop Michael Al-Kakari, and Bishop Yacoub Al-Ksorani. As they returned from Jerusalem, where they had consecrated the Chrism, they also visited the village of Sadad in Syria in 1614 (AG 1925). He then went on to Homs and ordained two priests.

Hidayat Allah consecrated the Chrism at Aleppo in 1625 (AG 1936) with the Armenian patriarch and Diyūnūsyūs, bishop of Aleppo, Sāwīrūs, bishop of Edessa, Qūrīllūs, bishop of the Monastery of Mar Ilyan, and Diyūsqūrūs, bishop of the Monastery of Mar Musa. He ordained Yuhanna Stephen as metropolitan of the Monastery of Qartmin in 1627. He served as patriarch of Antioch until 1639 or 1640.

== Bibliography ==
- Barsoum, Aphrem (2003). The Scattered Pearls: A History of Syriac Literature and Sciences. Translated by Matti Moosa (2nd ed.). Gorgias Press.
- Barsoum, Aphrem (2008a). History of the Za'faran Monastery. Translated by Matti Moosa. Gorgias Press.
- Barsoum, Aphrem (2008b). The History of Tur Abdin. Translated by Matti Moosa. Gorgias Press.
- Bcheiry, Iskandar (2004). "A List of the Syrian Orthodox Patriarchs between 16th and 18th Century: A Historical Supplement to Michael the Syrian's Chronicle in a MS. of Sadad". Parole de l'Orient. 29: 211–261.
- Bcheiry, Iskandar (2010). A List of Syriac Orthodox Ecclesiastic Ordinations from the Sixteenth and Seventeenth Century: The Syriac Manuscript of Hunt 444 (Syr 68 in Bodleian Library, Oxford). Gorgias Press.
- Bcheiry, Iskandar (2013). The Account of the Syriac Orthodox Patriarch Yūḥanun Bar Šay Allāh (1483–1492): The Syriac Manuscript of Cambridge: DD.3.8(1). Gorgias Press.
- Burleson, Samuel; Van Rompay, Lucas (2011). "List of Patriarchs: II. The Syriac Orthodox Church and its Uniate continuations". In Sebastian P. Brock; Aaron M. Butts; George A. Kiraz; Lucas Van Rompay (eds.). Gorgias Encyclopedic Dictionary of the Syriac Heritage: Electronic Edition. Gorgias Press.
- Koriah, Yacoub (1976). The Syrian Orthodox Church in the Holy Land.
- Wilmshurst, David (2019). "West Syrian patriarchs and maphrians". In Daniel King (ed.). The Syriac World. Routledge. pp. 806–813.

| Preceded by Ignatius Pilate | Syriac Orthodox Patriarch of Antioch; 1597/1598–1639/1640 | Succeeded by Ignatius Simon |
