= Yemişli, Midyat =

Village in Mardin Province, Turkey

Yemişli
- Neighbourhood
- Location in Turkey
- Coordinates: 37°19′41″N 41°20′30″E
- Country: Turkey
- Province: Mardin
- District: Midyat
- Population (2021): 486
- Time zone: UTC+3 (TRT)

Yemişli (Note: "Place with fruits" in Turkish. Also spelt as Yemishli.) (Arabic: انحل; Kurdish: Nehile; (Note: Also spelt as Enḥel, Enhil, or Nähile.) Syriac: ܐܢܚܠ, romanized: Anḥil) (Note: Alternatively transliterated as Anhal, Anhel, Anḥel. Nisba: Nihlōyo.) is a neighbourhood in the municipality and district of Midyat, Mardin Province of Turkey. The village is populated by Syriacs and Kurds of the Şemikan tribe, including Yazidis, and had a population of 486 in 2021. It is located in the historic region of Tur Abdin.

In the village, there are two Syriac Orthodox churches of Mor Quryaqos (Note: Also spelt as Morī Qūryāqūs.) and Mor Eshayo and six chapels.

== History ==
Anḥil (today called Yemişli) is attested by the name Bā Naḥli (Note: Also spelt as Beth Nahle ("between the valleys" in Syriac).) in the vita of Mar Isaiah of Aleppo, a disciple of Mar Awgin, in which it is mentioned that he baptised 630 Christian converts from the village in one day. 60 converts then went to build a monastery in the valley of Moshok. The Church of Mor Eshayo was constructed in the 4th century. The Church of Mor Quryaqos was built by Mor Simeon of the Olives (d. 734) according to local tradition. The Church of Mor Quryaqos is supposed to have been wrecked by Timur and left in ruins for several hundred years.

Rabban Saliba of Anḥil is counted amongst the three monks at Monastery of Mar Malke in 1583. Basilius Isaiah of Anḥil was Maphrian of the East in c. 1624–c. 1646. Ignatius Simon, Syriac Orthodox Patriarch of Antioch in 1640–1653, was from Anḥil. Basil Barṣawmo of Anḥil was Maphrian of Tur Abdin in 1815–1830 and Basil ʿAbd al-Ahad Kindo of Anḥil was Maphrian of Tur Abdin in 1821–1844. The Syriac Orthodox bishop Malke of Anḥil is attested at the Monastery of Mar Awgin in 1842/1843. Philoxenus Zaytun of Anḥil was metropolitan of Midyat in 1851–1855. In the Syriac Orthodox patriarchal register of dues of 1870, it was recorded that the village had 82 households, who paid 90 dues, and did not have a priest. Athanasius Denha Rumi of Anḥil was ordained as metropolitan of the Jazira in 1882.

In 1914, it was inhabited by 700 Syriacs, according to the list presented to the Paris Peace Conference by the Assyro-Chaldean delegation. The Syriacs at Anḥil adhered to the Syriac Orthodox Church. It was one of the largest villages in Tur Abdin. Amidst the Sayfo, Christian refugees flocked to the village and Kurds, Turks, and Mhallami planned to attack Anḥil after the fall of Midyat, but they instead decided to concentrate their attacks on ‘Ayn-Wardo and armed guards were posted at Anḥil who allowed entry but not exit. The villagers consequently smuggled salt, food, and weapons to ‘Ayn-Wardo. The successful defence of ‘Ayn-Wardo ensured that Anḥil was never attacked during the genocide.

The population of the village was 1281 in 1960. There were 1306 Turoyo-speaking Christians in 200 families in 1966. The village had a priest in 1979. A school was active in the village in 1981. In the late 20th century, Syriacs at Anḥil emigrated to Germany, Sweden, and Switzerland. Gevriye Bulut, the Syriac mukhtar of Anḥil, and his son Sami were murdered by Hezbollah and the mullah of Anḥil on 5 January 1990. Upon the discovery of the involvement of the mullah of Anḥil, the mullahs of nearby villages arranged a meeting with the Syriac men of Anḥil and threatened to kill them if they were to appeal to the authorities to punish the mullah of Anḥil. Many of the Syriacs of Anḥil decided to leave the village for Europe as a consequence. Syriacs began to return to the village in the 2000s. The churches of Mor Quryaqos and Mor Eshayo were renovated and reopened in 2010. By 2019, the village population was 514, including 150 Syriacs and 70 Muslim households.

== Demography ==
The following is a list of the number of Syriac families that have inhabited Anḥil per year stated. Unless otherwise stated, all figures are from the list provided in The Syrian Orthodox Christians in the Late Ottoman Period and Beyond: Crisis then Revival, as noted in the bibliography below. (Note: The size of a single family varies between five and ten persons.)

- 1915: 200 (Note: According to Courtois, there was 40 Syriac families in 1915.)
- 1966: 200
- 1978: 152
- 1979: 140
- 1980: 120
- 1981: 135
- 1987: 82
- 1995: 7
- 2013: 7

== Bibliography ==
- Atto, Naures (2011). Hostages in the Homeland, Orphans in the Diaspora: Identity Discourses Among the Assyrian/Syriac Elites in the European Diaspora (PDF). Leiden University Press.
- Barsoum, Aphrem (2003). The Scattered Pearls: A History of Syriac Literature and Sciences. Translated by Matti Moosa (2nd ed.). Gorgias Press.
- Barsoum, Aphrem (2008a). History of the Za'faran Monastery. Translated by Matti Moosa. Gorgias Press.
- Barsoum, Aphrem (2008b). The History of Tur Abdin. Translated by Matti Moosa. Gorgias Press.
- Bcheiry, Iskandar (2009). The Syriac Orthodox Patriarchal Register of Dues of 1870: An Unpublished Historical Document from the Late Ottoman Period. Gorgias Press.
- Bcheiry, Iskandar (2019). "Digitizing and Schematizing the Archival Material from the Late Ottoman Period Found in the Monastery of al-Zaʿfarān in Southeast Turkey" (PDF). Atla Summary of Proceedings. 72 (January): 50–61. doi:10.31046/proceedings.2018.113.
- Biner, Zerrin Özlem (2020). States of Dispossession: Violence and Precarious Coexistence in Southeast Turkey. University of Pennsylvania Press.
- Brock, Sebastian (2021). "The Syrian Orthodox Church in the twentieth century". Eastern Christianity, Theological Reflection on Religion, Culture, and Politics in the Holy Land and Christian Encounter with Islam and the Muslim World (PDF). Living Stones of the Holy Land Trust. pp. 155–181.
- Courtois, Sébastien de (2004). The Forgotten Genocide: Eastern Christians, The Last Arameans. Translated by Vincent Aurora. Gorgias Press.
- Courtois, Sébastien de (2013). "Tur Abdin : Réflexions sur l'état présent descommunautés syriaques du Sud-Est de la Turquie, mémoire, exils, retours". Cahier du Gremmamo (in French). 21: 113–150.
- Dinno, Khalid S. (2017). The Syrian Orthodox Christians in the Late Ottoman Period and Beyond: Crisis then Revival. Gorgias Press.
- Fiey, Jean Maurice (2004). Lawrence Conrad (ed.). Saints Syriaques (in French). The Darwin Press.
- Gaunt, David (2006). Massacres, Resistance, Protectors: Muslim-Christian Relations in Eastern Anatolia during World War I. Gorgias Press.
- Jongerden, Joost; Verheij, Jelle, eds. (2012). Social Relations in Ottoman Diyarbekir, 1870-1915. Brill.
- Keser-Kayaalp, Elif, ed. (January 2022). Syriac Architectural Heritage at Risk in TurʿAbdin (PDF).
- Palmer, Andrew (1990). Monk and Mason on the Tigris Frontier: The Early History of Tur Abdin. Cambridge University Press.
- Ritter, Hellmut (1967). Turoyo: Die Volkssprache der Syrischen Christen des Tur 'Abdin (in German). Vol. 1. Franz Steiner Verlag.
- Sinclair, T.A. (1989). Eastern Turkey: An Architectural & Archaeological Survey. Vol. III. Pindar Press. ISBN 9780907132349.
- Tan, Altan (2018). Turabidin'den Berriye'ye. Aşiretler - Dinler - Diller - Kültürler (in Turkish). Pak Ajans Yayincilik Turizm Ve Diş Ticaret Limited şirketi. ISBN 9789944360944.
- Wilmshurst, David (2000). The Ecclesiastical Organisation of the Church of the East, 1318–1913 (PDF). Peeters Publishers.
- Wilmshurst, David (2019). "West Syrian patriarchs and maphrians". In Daniel King (ed.). The Syriac World. Routledge. pp. 806–813.
