= Syriac Orthodox Archdiocese of Beirut =

Archdiocese of Beirut

Syriac Orthodox Church
- Incumbent; Clemis Daniel Malak Kourieh
- Style: Archbishop His Eminence

The Syriac Orthodox Archdiocese of Beirut is a nominally Metropolitan Archeparchy of the Syriac Orthodox Church in Lebanon. The incumbent metropolitan of Beirut is Mor Clemis Daniel Malak Kourieh.

== Early history ==
Christianity in Beirut started spreading after Saint Peter, who ordained an associate as Bishop of Beirut and another for Tripoli, while the Apostle Jude (also known as Lebbaeus or Calbis) preached in the city. Local tradition and historical accounts record that Calbis preached in Beirut, founded a church, died, and was buried there; in his honor, local Christians built a church on his name and was later called "The Most Esteemed Church," which was commemorated annually on August 20 and visited in 487–488 by Zacharias Rhetor and his companion Severus, later Patriarch Seversus of Antioch while studying at the Beirut School of Jurisprudence. Qaqarts (or Quartus), one of the seventy disciples and an assistant to Saint Paul, is considered the first bishop of Beirut.

In the fourth century, Gregory served as Bishop of Beirut and attended the First Council of Nicaea in 325. He was followed by Eusebius, who later moved to the sees of Nicomedia and Constantinople while adhering to Arianism, and Timothy, who was among the fathers of the First Council of Constantinople. In the fifth century, Bishop Eustathius (443–460) received correspondence from Emperor Theodosius II to hold a synod in Beirut in 448 regarding Nestorian allegations against Hiba (Yahiba), Metropolitan of Edessa, and Daniel, Bishop of Hauran. Eustathius attended the Second Council of Ephesus and played a significant role at the Council of Chalcedon in 451, reading his Orthodox confession of faith before signing the council's decrees under duress while weeping bitterly alongside other coerced bishops.

Beirut was originally a suffragan see under Photios, Metropolitan of Tyre, but through a jurisdictional dispute and the intervention of Emperor Theodosius II, Eustathius was elevated to an independent metropolitan directly under the See of Antioch. This temporarily annexed the northern sees, including Byblos (Jbeil), Botrys (Batroun), Tripoli, Artousia (Artos), Arqa, and Tartus, to Eustathius' jurisdiction, leading him to depose bishops previously appointed by Photios. However, at Chalcedon in 451, Photios reclaimed these suffragan sees after highlighting Eustathius' support for Dioscorus of Alexandria, a request approved by the council.

In the late fifth and early sixth centuries, John served as Bishop of Beirut, exchanging correspondence with Rabbula of Samosata, who established a prominent mountain monastery in Lebanon. During this era, the young Severus, the future Patriarch of Antioch, studied law in Beirut, received instruction in the Non-Chalcedonian Christian faith, and frequented the city's places of worship before his baptism in 488 at the Church of Saint Leontius. Contemporary records identify active churches during this period, including the Cathedral of the Apostle Philip (or Church of the Apostle), the Church of Anastasia (founded by Eustathius), the Church of the Mother of God at the harbor, the Church of the Martyr Leontius (Laodice), the Church of Saint Stephen the Archdeacon, and the Church of the Resurrection built by Eustathius. Prominent monastic communities included the Monastery of the Monk from Edessa, the Monastery of Beirut, the Monastery of Matrou, the Monastery of Saint Zenon the Stylite, and the monastery founded by Rabbula.

During the reign of Emperor Anastasius I (491–518), Metropolitan Marin of Beirut supported Severus's ascension to the patriarchal throne of Antioch (512–518) and maintained close ties and shared sacraments with him. Marin was succeeded by Thalass in the sixth century, who aligned with the Chalcedonian Council and joined other Eastern bishops in a 536 petition to Pope Agapetus I regarding the excommunication of Anthimus of Constantinople. Following this period, devastating earthquakes, tidal waves, and fires, specifically in 451, 551, 554, and 560, ravaged the coastal towns of Lebanon. Michael the Great recorded that the sea receded two miles before engulfing citizens, after which collapsing structures and a two-month fire destroyed Beirut, leaving it ruined for generations and crippling its famous law school. Although Syriacs later settled in the region and patriarchs such as Michael the Great and Ignatius III visited the local faithful during apostolic journeys between Antioch and Jerusalem, Beirut declined significantly. By the nineteenth century, only a very small Syriac Orthodox community remained living in the city, though Beirut eventually recovered its prominence in later centuries to become the capital of the Lebanese Republic.

== Modern history ==
Syriac Orthodox Christians from Damascus and Aleppo took refuge at Beirut in the 19th century after insurrections. More Syriac Orthodox Christians fled Eastern Turkey, particularly around Diyarbakır, to Beirut following the massacres in 1895 and the Sayfo. About 50 Syriac Orthodox families moved from Aleppo to Beirut in 1932–1933. The Cathedral of Saint Peter and Saint Paul at Mousaitbeh was consecrated in 1933 and principally served the Syriac Orthodox Christians who had moved there from Adana, Mardin, Diyarbakır, Qillath, and Tur Abdin. From 1933, Beirut was part of the Archdiocese of Beirut and Damascus. The Syriac Orthodox patriarchate was moved to Damascus in 1959 and Beirut became part of the archdiocese of Lebanon.

The Patriarchal Vicariate of Mount Lebanon and the Patriarchal Vicariate of Zahle were split from the archdiocese in 1970. The Patriarchal Vicariate of Zahle was merged with the archdiocese to form the Archdiocese of Beirut and Zahle in 1980. The Church of Saint Aphrem at Achrafieh was constructed in 1993. The Patriarchal Vicariate of Zahle was split from the archdiocese again in 1998. By 2005, the archdiocese had 5 clergy. The Church of Saint Aphrem at Achrafieh was damaged by the 2020 Beirut explosion.

== List of archbishops ==
The following is a list of incumbents of the see:

- Dionysius Behnam Jijawi (1959–1965)
- Athanasius Aphrem Barsaum (1965–2008) (Note: Athanasius Aphrem Barsaum was patriarchal vicar in Beirut in 1964–1965.)
- Clemis Daniel Malak Kourieh (2009–present)

== Ecclesiastical properties ==
The following ecclesiastical properties belong to the archdiocese:

- Cathedral of Saint Peter and Saint Paul, Mousaitbeh
- Church of Saint Aphrem, Achrafieh

== Bibliography ==
- Chaillot, Christine (1998). The Syrian Orthodox Church of Antioch and All the East: A Brief Introduction to Its Life and Spirituality.
- Dinno, Khalid S. (2017). The Syrian Orthodox Christians in the Late Ottoman Period and Beyond: Crisis then Revival. Gorgias Press.
- Fiey, Jean Maurice (1993). Pour un Oriens Christianus Novus: Répertoire des diocèses syriaques orientaux et occidentaux (in French).
