= Sinharib =

Sinharib or Sanharib (Classical Syriac: ܣܢܚܪܝܒ, romanized: Sanḥariv), according to the hagiography of Behnam, was an Assyrian king who controlled Nineveh in the fourth century AD. Nineveh was at this time in Asoristan in the Sasanian Empire. Sinharib is generally regarded to be an anachronistically placed and Christianized version of the ancient Assyrian king Sennacherib (r. 705–681 BC), cast in a role befitting the then Christian Assyrians so that he could still be revered.

According to the narrative in the hagiography, much like Julian the Apostate of the Roman Empire, Sinharib disliked Christianity and tried to persuade his son Behnam to reject Christianity. Although greatly influenced by the Zoroastrianism of the Persians at first, he later became Christian.

== See also ==
- Sennacherib
- Mar Behnam Monastery
