= 2014 Northern Iraq offensive =

2014 Northern Iraq offensive may refer to:

- Northern Iraq offensive (June 2014)
- Northern Iraq offensive (August 2014)
