= Yalım, Artuklu =

Village in Mardin Province, Turkey

Yalım
- Neighbourhood
- Location in Turkey
- Coordinates: 37.325°N 40.738°E
- Country: Turkey
- Province: Mardin
- District: Artuklu
- Population (2024): 25,803
- Time zone: UTC+3 (TRT)

Yalım (Arabic: المنصورية; Kurdish: Mansuriye; Syriac: ܡܢܨܘܪܝܗ̇, romanized: Mansūriyya) (Note: Alternatively transliterated as Manṣūriyyah, Mansuriyye, Mansuri, Mansori, and Mansourié.) is a neighbourhood of the municipality and district of Artuklu, Mardin Province, Turkey. Its population is 25,803 (2024). Before the 2013 reorganisation, it was a town (belde). It is populated by Kurds of the Daşî and Meşkinan tribes.

== History ==
Mansūriyya (today called Yalım) was historically inhabited by Syriac Orthodox Christians and Syriac Catholics. In the 16th century, there were 357 Syriac families in the village (approximately 2400 people). Basilius ʿAbd al-Ghanī al-Manṣūrī was Maphrian of the East in 1557–1575. 7 priests and 28 deacons were ordained to serve the Syriac Orthodox Church of Morī Osyō at Mansuriyya in 1573–1589. Iyawannis Li’azar of Mansuriyya was ordained as bishop of Mansuriyya by Patriarch Ignatius Abdulmasih I in 1684 and served in that role until his elevation to maphrian in 1709. The Church of Mar Theodorus at Mansuriyya was built by Patriarch Ignatius Shukrallah II with Timothy ‘Isa of Mosul, metropolitan of Mardin, and consecrated in 1729. A large silver cross was made for the Church of St Asya at Mansuriyya by Cyril Gurgis, ecumenical metropolitan of the Patriarchal Office, in 1739, at which time the church had three priests.

In the Syriac Orthodox patriarchal register of dues of 1870, it was recorded that the village had 96 households, who paid 346 dues, and did not have a priest. The village was attacked by Kurds on 5 and 10 November 1895 amidst the Hamidian massacres. It was situated in the Mardin central kaza (district) of the Mardin sanjak in the Diyarbekir vilayet in c. 1900. The Chaldean Catholic priest Joseph Tfinkdji estimated the village had a population of 1000 in 1914, including 500 Syriac Orthodox Christians, 100 Syriac Protestants, and 80 Syriac Catholics, who were served by one priest, one chapel, and one school, whilst the rest of the population was Muslim.

In 1914, it was inhabited by 400 Syriacs, according to the list presented to the Paris Peace Conference by the Assyro-Chaldean delegation. At the onset of the First World War, it was populated by 400 families, of whom half were Christians whilst the other half were Kurds who belonged to the Dashi tribe. There were 250 Syriac Orthodox and Syriac Catholic families; both communities had their own church. Many of the young Christians in the village went into hiding to avoid conscription to the army.

Mansūriyya was surrounded by Kurds on 11 June 1915 amidst the Sayfo. The Dashi Kurds initially extorted money and seized property from the village's Christians in exchange for not revealing those in hiding. However, the authorities began to search for those in hiding after the Syriac Orthodox Christians had given the names of some of the Syriac Catholic youths. At this time, a judge ruled that the Kurds had to return the money that they had seized. The Christians were subsequently attacked on the night of 16 June by the Dashi Kurds and many of the Syriac Catholics took refuge in the church. 41 people were killed in the church and 2 men were burned alive after a Kurdish leader named Chachano Sayrane deceived the Syriacs by promising to protect them and then opening the doors to the church to the Kurds. 95 Christians are recorded to have been killed at this point.

Soldiers from Mardin who had been sent to Mansūriyya ostensibly to chase out the Dashi Kurds instead joined them in the massacre. The village's surviving Christian population all fled to Mardin on 17 June to take refuge in its Syriac Orthodox church, where they stayed for 10 days. The authorities guaranteed the safety of the Christians and provided 7 soldiers to escort 70 women who were to return to Mansūriyya to collect their property, but they were attacked by the Dashi Kurds and killed in a cave, leaving only two survivors. 100 women who had returned to Mansūriyya after receiving assurances of safety were attacked and killed by the Dashi Kurds after a month and their bodies were thrown into a well. The surviving Christians consequently remained at Mardin.

== Administrative history ==
Yalım was a village until 1995 when it became a municipality (belde). It maintained the belde status until 2013 when it became attached to the municipality of Artuklu as a neighbourhood.

== Population ==
Historical population of Yalım:

Population
Year	Pop.	±% p.a.
1935	617	—
1960	2,307	+5.42%
1965	2,615	+2.54%
1970	1,636	−8.95%
1980	2,316	+3.54%
1990	2,674	+1.45%
2000	3,827	+3.65%
2010	5,802	+4.25%
2020	19,807	+13.06%
2024	25,803	+6.83%

== Bibliography ==
- Abed Mshiho Neman of Qarabash (2021) [1918]. Sayfo – An Account of the Assyrian Genocide. Translated by Michael Abdalla; Łukasz Kiczko. Edinburgh University Press.
- Barsoum, Aphrem (2003). The Scattered Pearls: A History of Syriac Literature and Sciences. Translated by Matti Moosa (2nd ed.). Gorgias Press.
- Barsoum, Aphrem (2009). History of the Syriac Dioceses. Vol. 1. Translated by Matti Moosa. Gorgias Press.
- Bcheiry, Iskandar (2009). The Syriac Orthodox Patriarchal Register of Dues of 1870: An Unpublished Historical Document from the Late Ottoman Period. Gorgias Press.
- Bcheiry, Iskandar (2010). A List of Syriac Orthodox Ecclesiastic Ordinations from the Sixteenth and Seventeenth Century: The Syriac Manuscript of Hunt 444 (Syr 68 in Bodleian Library, Oxford). Gorgias Press.
- Courtois, Sébastien de (2004). The Forgotten Genocide: Eastern Christians, The Last Arameans. Translated by Vincent Aurora. Gorgias Press.
- Gaunt, David (2006). Massacres, Resistance, Protectors: Muslim-Christian Relations in Eastern Anatolia during World War I. Gorgias Press.
- Göyünç, Nejat (1969). XVI. Yüzyılda Mardin Sancağı (in Turkish).
- Jongerden, Joost; Verheij, Jelle, eds. (2012). Social Relations in Ottoman Diyarbekir, 1870-1915. Brill.
- Tan, Altan (2018). Turabidin'den Berriye'ye. Aşiretler - Dinler - Diller - Kültürler (in Turkish). ISBN 9789944360944.
