= Basil Lazarus III =

- Syriac Orthodox Maphrian of the East
- Church: Syriac Orthodox Church
- Installed: 1709
- Term ended: 1713
- Predecessor: Basil Isaac
- Successor: Basil Matthew II
- Previous post: Bishop of Mansuriyya

Personal details
- Born: Iyawannis Lazarus
- Died: 1713

Basil Lazarus III was the Syriac Orthodox Maphrian of the East from 1709 until his death in 1713.

== Biography ==
Iyawannis Lazarus was ordained bishop of Mansuriyya by Patriarch Ignatius Abdulmasih I in 1684, in which year he later also attended the consecration of the Holy Chrism at the Church of the Forty Martyrs at Mardin. In 1709, Lazarus was ordained as Maphrian of the East by Patriarch Ignatius Isaac II, upon which he assumed the name Basil. Lazarus served as Maphrian of the East until his death in mid-1713.

== Bibliography ==
- Barsoum, Aphrem (2009). History of the Syriac Dioceses. Vol. 1. Translated by Matti Moosa. Gorgias Press.

Preceded by Basil Isaac	Syriac Orthodox Maphrian of the East; 1709–1713	Succeeded by Basil Matthew II
