= Cathedral of Saint George, Damascus =

Cathedral of the Syriac Orthodox Church in Damascus, Syria

Coordinates: 33.51045°N 36.315017°E

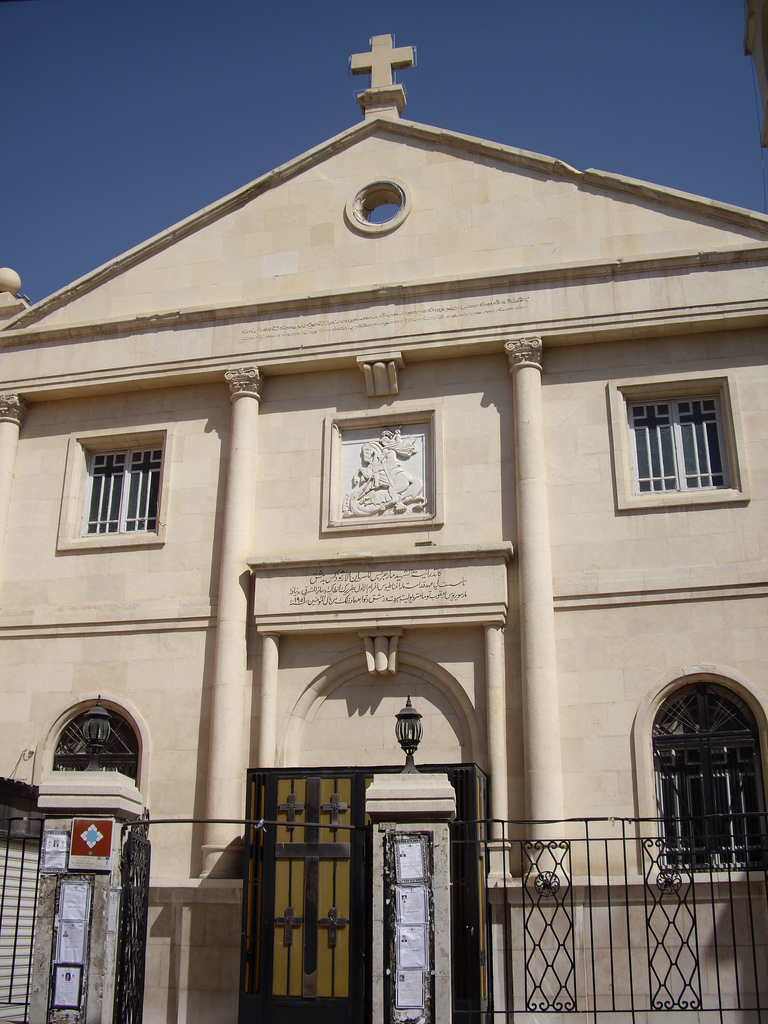
Cathedral of Saint George in Damascus, Syria.

The Cathedral of Saint George is a Syriac Orthodox cathedral located in Bab Tuma district, in Old Damascus, Syria. The Cathedral acts as the seat of the Syriac Orthodox Church since 1959. It houses the Syriac Orthodox Patriarch of Antioch, currently Ignatius Aphrem II as the bishop of Syriac Orthodox Patriarchal Archdiocese of Damascus.

== See also ==
- List of cathedrals in Syria
- Mor Hananyo Monastery
- Saint Mary Church of the Holy Belt
