= Mar Behnam Monastery =

Syriac Catholic Monastery in Iraq

Monastery of the Sahade Mar Behnam and Marth Sara
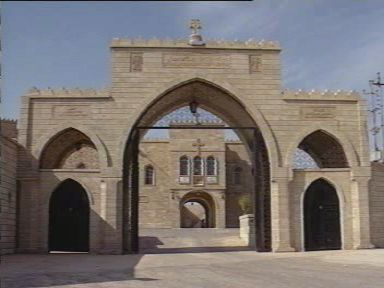
- Entrance of the monastery (1999)

- Location within Iraq

Monastery information
- Order: Syriac Catholic Church (1790–98; from 1839); Syriac Orthodox Church (until 1790; 1798–1819)
- Established: 4th century
- Dedication: Mar Behnam, Mart Sara

People
- Founder: Sinharib

Site
- Location: near Beth Khdeda
- Coordinates: 36.137778°N 43.406389°E

Monastery of the Martyrs Mar Behnam and Marth Sarah (Syriac: ܕܝܪܐ ܕܡܪܝ ܒܗܢܡ ܘܡܪܬ ܣܪܐ, Arabic: دير مار بهنام, Mar Behnam Monastery) is a Syriac Catholic monastery in northern Iraq in the village Khidr Ilyas close to the town of Beth Khdeda. Until the 19th century, it was a Syriac Orthodox monastery. The tomb of Mar Benham was heavily damaged on March 19, 2015, by the Islamic State, and the exterior murals were desecrated in all of the monastery's buildings. Repair work restoring the monastery and the tomb of Mar Behnam to its pre-ISIS condition was completed by early December 2018.

== History ==
The monastery was according to legend built in the 4th century by a king named Senchareb as penance for martyring his son Mar Behnam and daughter Sarah after they converted to Christianity.

After its establishment, the monastery was part of the Church of the East up until the 14th century as evidenced by Mongolic inscriptions left by Mongolian Christian pilgrims in the 1200s, and contributed greatly to the Christian world under the care of the Syriac Orthodox Church. Inscriptions on sculptures in the church show that renovations were made to the monastery in 1164 and between 1250 and 1261. Records show that the monastery suffered greatly during the period from 1743 to 1790 due to attacks carried out by Nader Shah and later Persian Muslim rulers against the Christians in the region.

In 1790 the monastery was taken over by the Catholic Church and was managed for eight years until the Syriac Orthodox church retook it. For unknown reasons, the monks abandoned the monastery in 1819—likely due to the loss of their flock in that region. The Syriac Catholic Church resumed possession of the monastery, and repopulated it in 1839; it has continued in this state to the present time with the exception of a three-year abandonment as a result of the 2014 ISIS invasions.

The monastery is the former residence and present resting place of a number of Syriac Orthodox Patriarchs.

== Current status ==
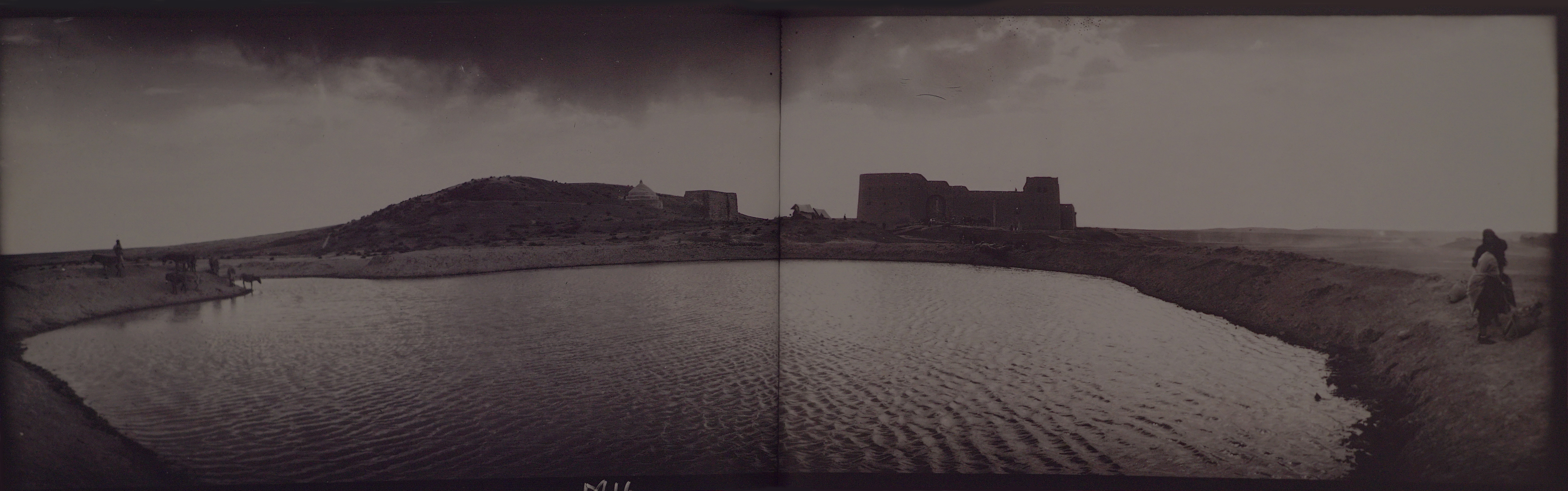
Syriac Catholic Monastery of Mar Behnam, May 1909, taken by Gertrude Bell

The monastery was renovated in 1986, and was visited by thousands of Christians and Muslims yearly until ISIS took control of the area.

During the 2014 Northern Iraq offensive, jihadist troops of Islamic State of Iraq and the Levant took control of the monastery. The troops removed crosses from the monastery, threatened monks with execution and then expelled the monks with nothing but the clothes on their backs. On March 19, 2015, Islamic State released photos showing the blowing up of the historic tomb of Saint Behnam. After more than 2 years of occupation, the monastery and its surrounding area was liberated by Iraqi Security Forces on November 20, 2016.

Repair work restoring the monastery and the tomb of Mar Behnam to its pre-ISIS condition was completed by early December 2018.
