= Mor Mattai Monastery =

Syriac Orthodox Monastery in Iraq. Founded 363 AD

Monastery of St. Matthew
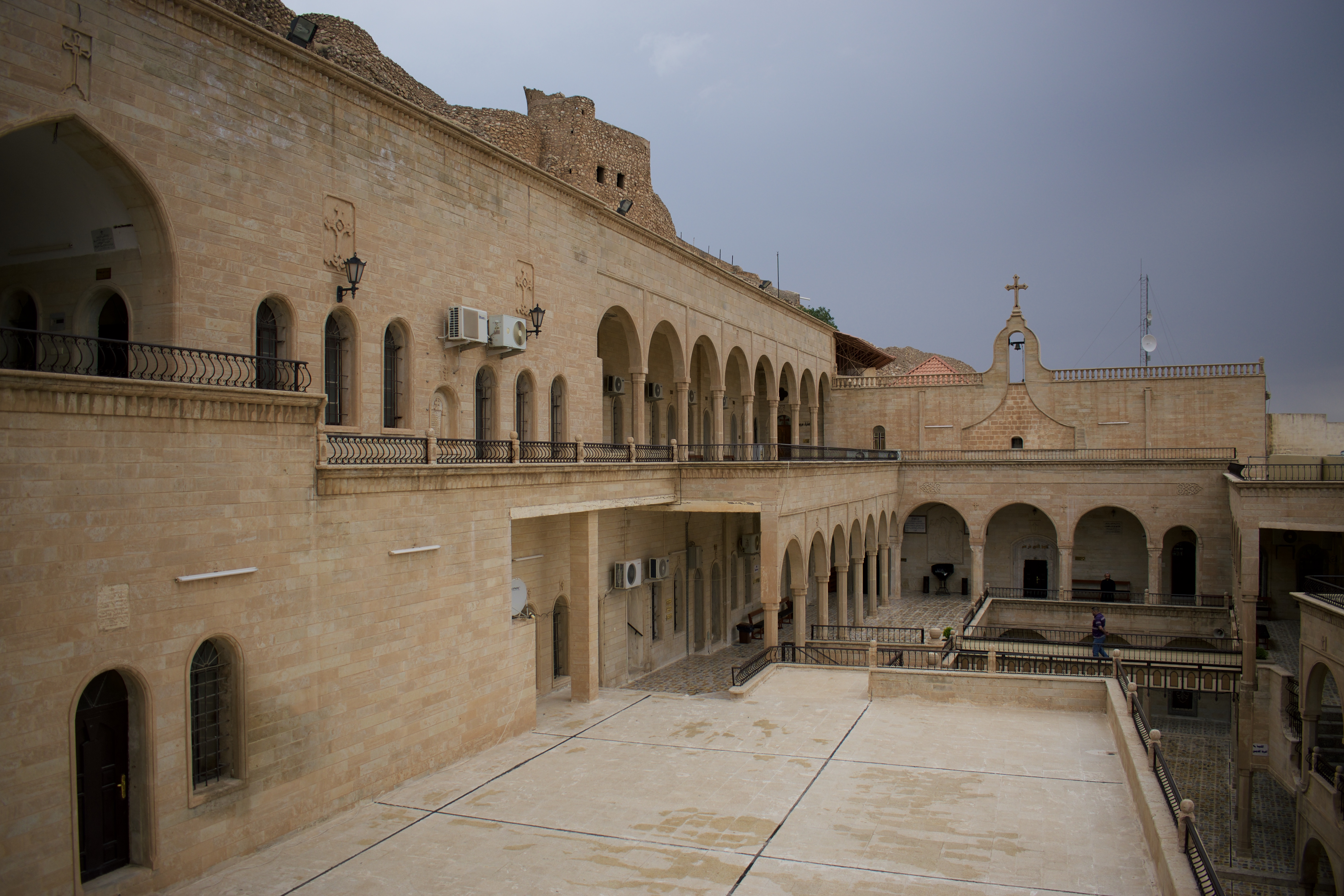
- Mor Mattai Monastery

- Location within Iraq Location within Near East
- Interactive map of Monastery of St. Matthew

Monastery information
- Other name: Dayro d-Mor Mattai
- Order: Syriac Orthodox Church
- Established: 363 A.D.
- Dedication: Mor Mattai

Site
- Location: near Bartella, Nineveh
- Country: Iraq
- Coordinates: 36.49°N 43.442778°E

Dayro d-Mor Mattai (Syriac: ܕܝܪܐ ܕܡܪܝ ܡܬܝ; Arabic: دير مار متى; The Monastery of St. Matthew or Dayro d-Mor Mattai) is a Syriac Orthodox Church monastery on Mount Alfaf in northern Iraq. Located 20 kilometers northeast of the city of Mosul, it is recognized as one of the oldest Christian monasteries in existence and the oldest Syriac Orthodox monastery in the world.

The monastery was famous for the number of monks and scholars it housed, and for its large library and considerable collection of Syriac Christian manuscripts. Today, it is an archbishopric; the current archbishop is Mor Timothius Mousa Alshamany.

== History ==
=== Founding ===
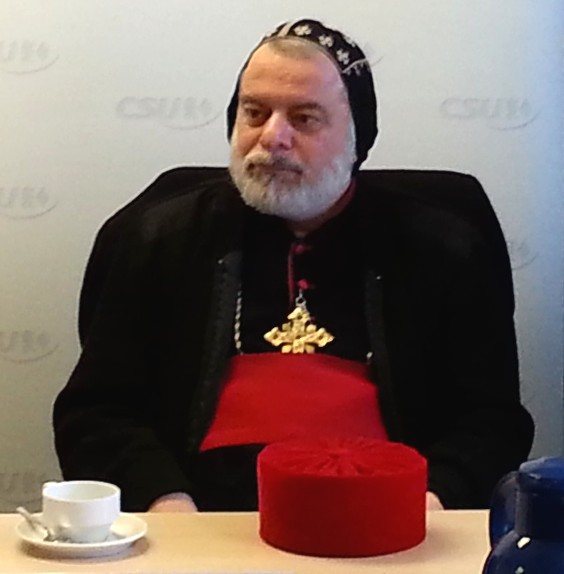
Mor Timothy Mosa Alshamany (2015), Archbishop of the monastery

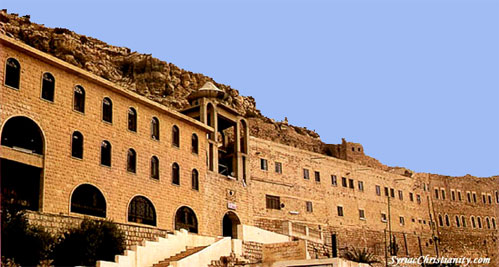
Mor Mattai Monastery

The monastery was founded in 363 AD by Mor Mattai the Hermit who fled persecution in Amid under the Roman Emperor Julian the Apostate with 25 other monks and took residence in Mount Alfaf. According to Syriac tradition, he converted Mor Behnam to Christianity and healed Behnam's sister, Sarah, whom he also converted. Their father, Sennacherib, was the Governor of the area of Nimrud, and appointed by the Persian King Shapur. He killed his son and daughter when he learned they became Christians, but he later recanted and built a church and a monastery on Mount Alfaf per Mor Mattai's request.

The church and monastery were surrounded by a strong wall and contained water tanks. The monks that came with Mor Mattai lived in huts and caves around the monastery and on the mountain itself. Mor Mattai became the monastery superior and under his leadership the community developed a true monastic ethos. When Mor Mattai died, he was interred in the monastery. He was succeeded by Mor Zakai, one of the monks who came with him from Amid.

=== 12th–16th centuries ===
In the 12th century, after storming a nunnery in Khudida, Kurds attacked the monastery for four months with 1,000 horsemen and foot soldiers. The monks burnt the ladders to prevent their entry. The Kurds rolled two large boulders against the walls from above, breaking a hole through which the Kurds tried to force entrance. The monks successfully fought back with stones and darts before repairing the walls. Abbot Abu Nser, the monastery superior, lost an eye in this battle. Eventually, the Kurds were bribed with gold and silver from the churches and retreated.

In 1171, tribal Hadhabani Kurds led several attacks on the monastery and were repelled by a coalition of monks and local Christians. The Kurds promised the monks they would cease their attacks and paid them 30 dinars; believing their monastery would be safe, the monks sent the local Christians back to their villages. Later, a force of 1,500 Kurds pillaged the monastery and killed 15 monks who could not find refuge in the upper citadel. The monks who survived the attack abandoned the monastery and relocated to Mosul. Upon hearing of the attack, the governor of Mosul attacked the Kurds, killing many; in retaliation the Kurds destroyed nine Assyrian villages, killing their inhabitants and attacked the Monastery of Mar Sergius.

In 1369, another attack by Kurds on the monastery damaged many manuscripts. During the 19th century, Kurds looted the monastery numerous times.

=== 20th century–current ===
The monastery is the center of archdiocese of by the Syriac Orthodox Church that includes a number of villages below it and around it. Every year, Christians of various church denominations gather in the monastery on September 18 to commemorate the day of Mor Mattai's death.

== Councils ==
A synod (or council) is a large church conference attended by many of the metropolitans and bishops of the church. It is usually headed by the Patriarch. There were three synods that convened in Mor Mattai Monastery throughout its history.

=== First Synod (628 AD) ===
The first synod was held to renew the union between the Mor Mattai Monastery and the Syriac Orthodox Church. It was headed by Mor Mattai Monastery's Metropolitan Mar Christophorus and attended by John (secretary of the Patriarch Mar Athanasius I), Bishop Jirjis of Sinjar, Bishop Daniel of Banuhadra (modern Duhok), Bishop Gregroius of Baremman, and Bishop Yardafne of Shahrzoul. After long discussions, the attendees, along with other monks from the Monastery, traveled to Antioch to meet with the Patriarch Mar Athanasius to conclude the discussions of union and obtain his blessing to ordain three monks as bishops to fill some vacant dioceses in the east.

=== Second Synod (628 AD) ===
The second synod was held in November 628 after returning from the trip to Antioch mentioned above. It was headed by Mar Christophorus I and attended by Mar Marutha (the newly ordained metropolitan of Takrit) and many of the other Eastern bishops. They organized the dioceses of the East into twelve bishoprics. By the authority of Christophorus I, the council issued twenty-four canons intended to enhance the position of the metropolitan of Mor Mattai Monastery while overlooking the interest of the metropolitan of Takrit.

=== Third Synod (1930) ===
The third synod was presided over by Syrian Orthodox Patriarch Mor Ignatius Elias III (1917–1933) and moderated by Mor Severus Aphrem Barsoum (1889–1957), then Archbishop of Syria and Lebanon (later Patriarch Ignatius Aphrem I Barsoum). The Synod discussed post-war challenges such as the huge numbers of refugees, issued new canon laws, and sought to organize church affairs. Particular challenges included managing properties and endowments in different emerging nation-states in the Middle East and the globally scattered diaspora. Special attention was given to the situation of the Syriac Orthodox Church in India. The Synod issued 41 resolutions and enacted general law for the denominational synods for the Syriac Orthodox church that had 32 articles.

== Manuscripts ==
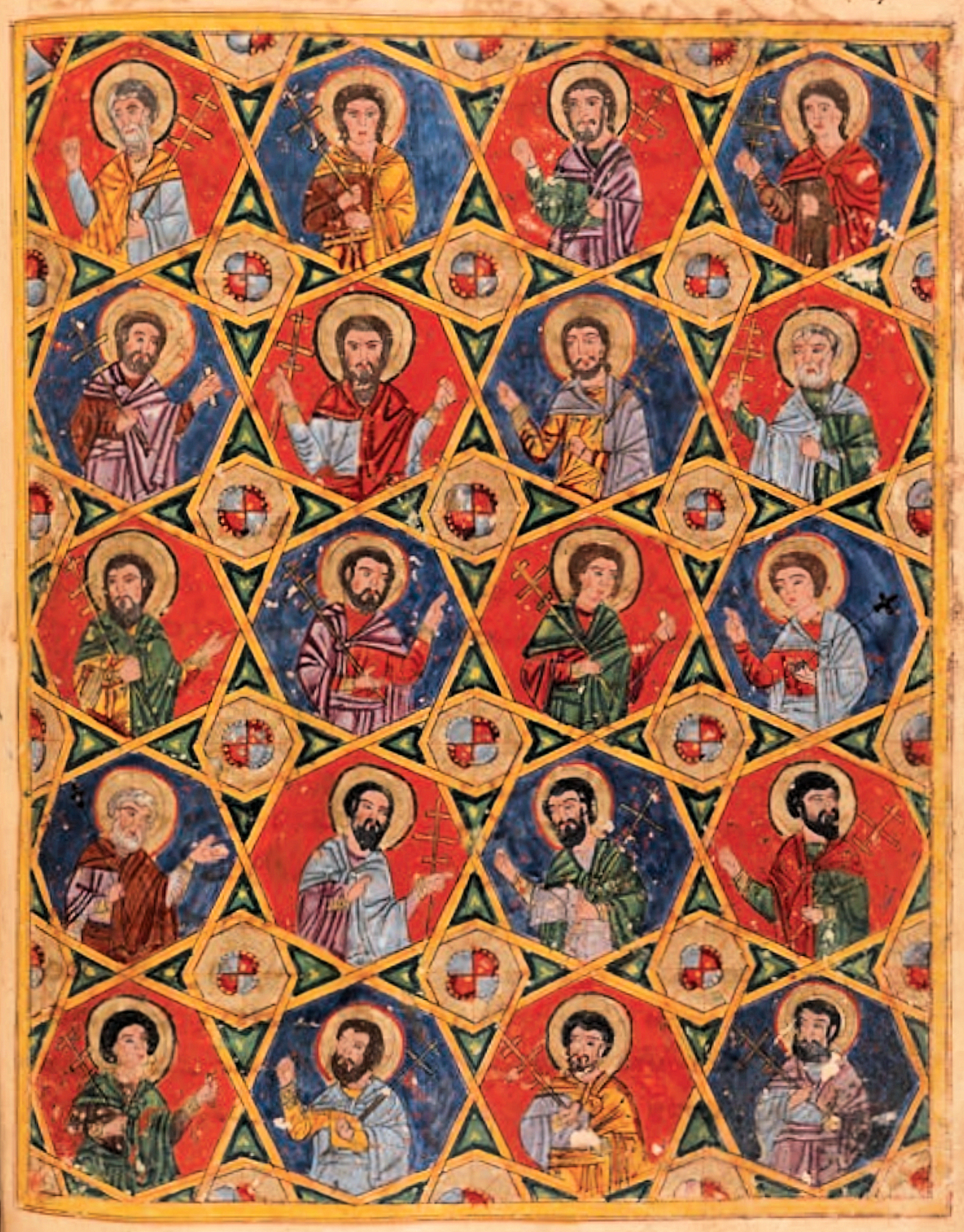
Twenty of the XL Martyrs of Sebaste, Syriac lectionary, copied at the monastery of Mar Mattai, near Mosul, Iraq; 1219–20 (Biblioteca Apostolica Vaticana, Syr. 559, fol. 93v.

Mor Mattai Monastery had rich libraries containing thousands of manuscripts throughout its long history. However, most manuscripts were lost during a huge fire in 480 AD and in many attacks from hostile enemies. Today, only 224 manuscripts remain in its library. The oldest manuscript is a copy of the New Testament which dates back to 1222 AD.

== Patriarchs ==
The Syriac Orthodox Church had three patriarchs that studied and graduated from Mor Mattai Monastery:

- Ignatius Jirjis II (1687–1708)
- Ignatius Ishaq (1709–1723)
- Ignatius Yacoub III (1958–1980)

== Maphrians ==
This is a list of all the maphrians that studied and graduated from Mor Mattai Monastery. "Maphrian of the East" is a church title that was bestowed as a position below the patriarch to manage the affairs of the eastern dioceses of the Syriac Orthodox Church. This position was created in the past because of the political divisions and wars between the Byzantine Empire in the west and the Persian Empire in the east. This office was abolished in 1860, by which time it had become a titular see, due to the decline in population of Syriac Orthodox Christians in the region.

- Mar Marutha (628–649)
- Denha I (649–659)
- John I Saba (686–688)
- John II Kionoyo (759–785)
- Gregorius IV Matthew (1317–1345)
- Basil Matthew II (1713–1727)
- Basil Li’azar IV (1730–1759)

== Mor Mattai Monastery metropolitans ==
This is a partial list of Mor Mattai Monastery's metropolitans. There are gaps in time where the monastery didn't have a residing metropolitan for various reasons, such as when the monastery was abandoned for long periods of time due to attacks from hostile armies.

- Bar Sohde (480)
- Garmay (544)
- Tubana
- Yeshu' Zkha
- Sahda
- Simon
- Christophorus I (628)
- John I (686)
- Anonymous (686)
- John II (752)
- Daniel (817)
- Quryaqos (824)
- Sarjis (Segius) Christophorus II (914)
- Timothy Soghde (1075–1120)
- Bar Kotella (1132)
- Anonymous (1152)
- Saliba (1189–1212)
- Severus Jacob I (1232–1241)
- Gregorius John III (1242–?)
- Ignatius (1269)
- Sawera (Severus) Yeshu' (1269–1272)
- Basilius Abrohom (1278)
- Iyawannis (1290)
- Jumu'a, son of Jubayr (1665)
- Severus Ishaq (1684–1687)
- Severus Malke (1694–1699)
- Iyawannis Matta I (1701–1712)
- Gregorius Li'azar (1728–1730)
- Timothy 'Isa (1737–1739)
- Iyawannis John IV (1743–1746)
- Cyril Rizq Allah (1760–1770)
- Cyril Matta II (1770–1782)
- Cyril 'Abd al-'Aziz (1782–1793)
- Eustathius Musa (1793–1828)
- Gregorius Elias I (1828–1838)
- Cyril Matta III (1846–1858)
- Cyril Denha (1858–1871)
- Cyril Elias II (1872–1921)
- Qlemis (Clement) V, John (1926–1930)
- Dionysius John VI (1935–1942)
- Timothy Jacob II (1946–1966)
- Severus Zakka Iwas (1966–1969) (later Ignatius Zakka I)
- Dioscorus Luka Shaya (1980–2005)
- Timothy Mosa Alshamany (2006–present)

== Mor Mattai Monastery superiors ==
The monastery superior is person who would manage the daily activities inside and outside the monastery. This person was usually a priest or a monk (Rabban). Some of them went on to be metropolitans or bishops in the Monastery or other Syriac Orthodox dioceses. This is a partial list.

- Mor Mattai
- Mar Zakai (late 4th century – early 5th century)
- Mar Abrohom
- Addai (628)
- Hawran (914)
- Bar Kotella (1130–1132)
- Anonymous (1174)
- Hasan Bar Shamma' (1243–1253)
- Rabban Abu Nasr (1261–1290)
- Rabban Matta II, Bar Hanno (1317)
- Rabban lshaq I (1675–1684)
- Rabban Tuma I (1712–1721)
- Rabban Li'azar (1727–1728)
- Rabban Matta III (1831–1833)
- Rabban Jacob (1917–1918, 1920–1921, and 1928–1929)
- The Chorepiscopus Sulayman (1921–1923, and 1926–1928)
- Rabban lshaq II (1929–1935)
- The Chorepiscopus Elias Sha'ya i (1942–1943 and 1945)
- Rabban Saliba (1943)
- Priest Tuma II (1945–1946)
- Priest Elias Bihnam (1964)
- Rabban Hanna Daoud Al-Kass (1967–1970)
- Rabban Ishaq III Saka (1970–1980)
- Metropolitan Dioscorus Luka Shaya (1980–2005)
- Metropolitan Timothy Mosa Al-Shamany (2015–Present)

== Metropolitans and bishops ==
This is a list of Syriac Orthodox church metropolitans and bishops who studied and graduated from Mor Mattai Monastery but served in different dioceses. The list also contains two brothers' names who were neither metropolitans nor bishops.

- Ith Alaha, bishop of Marga and Gomel (628)
- Aha, bishop of Firshapur and al-Anbar (628)
- Hananya, metropolitan of Mardin and Kafartut (793–816)
- Shamu'il, metropolitan of Sijistan
- Ishaq, bishop of Armenia
- Tuma, metropolitan of Tiberias
- Philotheous, metropolitan Afra-Khurasan
- Athanasius, bishop of Sadad
- Athanasius Behnam bar Sammana, bishop of Banuhdra (Duhuk in northern Iraq) (1265–1279)
- Iyawannis Denha, bishop of Baghdad (1265)
- John Wahb, bishop of Jazirat ibn 'Umar (1265–1280)
- Sawera Yeshu', bishop of Azerbayjan, Mor Mattai Monastery, and Tabriz (d. 1277)
- Dionysius Joseph, bishop of Tabriz (1277)
- Mikha'il Mukhlis, bishop of Baremman (1278)
- Denha John, bishop of the Mu'allaq Monastery (1278)
- Iyawannis Ayyub Gob, bishop of Banuhadra (modern Duhok) (1284)
- Dioscorus Gabriel of Bartulli, bishop of Jazirat ibn 'Umar (1284–1300)
- Abd Allah of Bartulli, metropolitan of Jazirat ibn 'Umar (1326)
- Dioscorus Jirjis, metropolitan of Jazirat ibn 'Umar (1677)
- Ishaq Saliba, metropolitan of the monastery of Mar Abai (1697)
- Athanasius Tuma, metropolitan of the Patriarchal Office and then of Jerusalem (1731–1748)
- Dionysius Behnam Samarchi, metropolitan of Mosul (1867–1911)
- Julius Behnam of 'Aqra, metropolitan of the Jazira (1871–1927)
- Gregorius Bulus Behnam, metropolitan of Mosul, then Baghdad (1952–1969)

== Burials ==
This is a list of Syriac Orthodox Church fathers and other clergy that are buried in Mor Mattai Monastery:

- Mor Mattai
- Mar Zakai
- Mar Abrohom
- Bishop Mar Bar Sohde (d. 480)
- Maphryono John V, of Sarug
- Maphryono Gregorius Jacob of Melitene
- Maphryono Gregorius Bar Hebraeus
- Maphryono Gregorius Barsoum al-Safi
- Maphryono Gregorius I, Matta of Bartulli (1317–1345)
- Maphryono Basilius IV, Li'azar of Mosul (1730–1759)
- Bishop Severns Jacob of Bartulli (1232–1241)
- Bishop Athanasius Behnam bar Sammana, bishop of Banuhadra, Duhok (1265–1279)
- Bishop Eustathius Musa Lashshi of Mosul (1793–1828)
- Bishop Cyril III, Matta of Mosul (1846–1858)
- Bishop Dionysius VI, John Mansurati (1935–1942)
- Bishop Cyril Denha of Hbob (1858–1871)
- Bishop Cyril II, Elias of Mosul (1872–1921)

== Sources ==
- Yacoub, H. H. Mar Ignatius (2008). Karim, Mor Cyril Aprhem (ed.). History of the Monastery of Saint Matthew in Mosul. Translated by Moosa, Matti (1st ed.). Piscataway, NJ: Gorgias Press, LLC. ISBN 978-1-59333-788-9.
