= Ignatius Ya'qub III =

121st Patriarch of Syriac Orthodox Church of Antioch (1957-1980)

His Holiness Moran Mor Ignatius Yaq'ub III Bartella Patriarch of Antioch and All the East
- 121st Patriarch of the Universal Syriac Orthodox Church
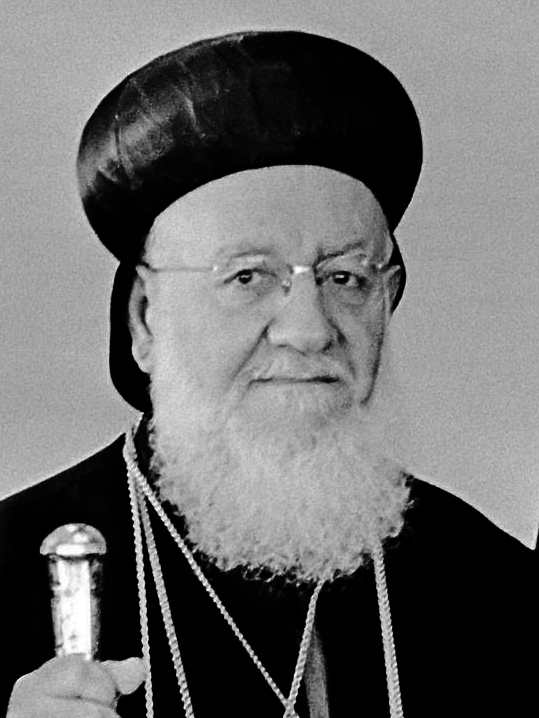
- Native name: ܡܪܢ ܡܪܝ ܐܝܓܢܐܛܝܘܣ ܝܥܩܘܒ ܬܠܝܬܝܐ
- Church: Syriac Orthodox Church
- See: Apostolic see of Antioch (and all the east)
- In office: 1957–1980
- Predecessor: Ignatius Aphrem I Barsoum
- Successor: Ignatius Zakka I Iwas
- Previous post: Metropolitan of Beirut and Damascus

Orders
- Ordination: by Ignatius Elias III
- Consecration: Bishop: 12 October 1950; Patriarch: 28 October 1957

Personal details
- Born: 12 October 1913 Bartella, Ottoman Empire
- Died: 26 June 1980 (aged 66) Damascus, Syria
- Buried: St. George's Patriarchal Cathedral, Damascus, Syria
- Denomination: Syriac Orthodox

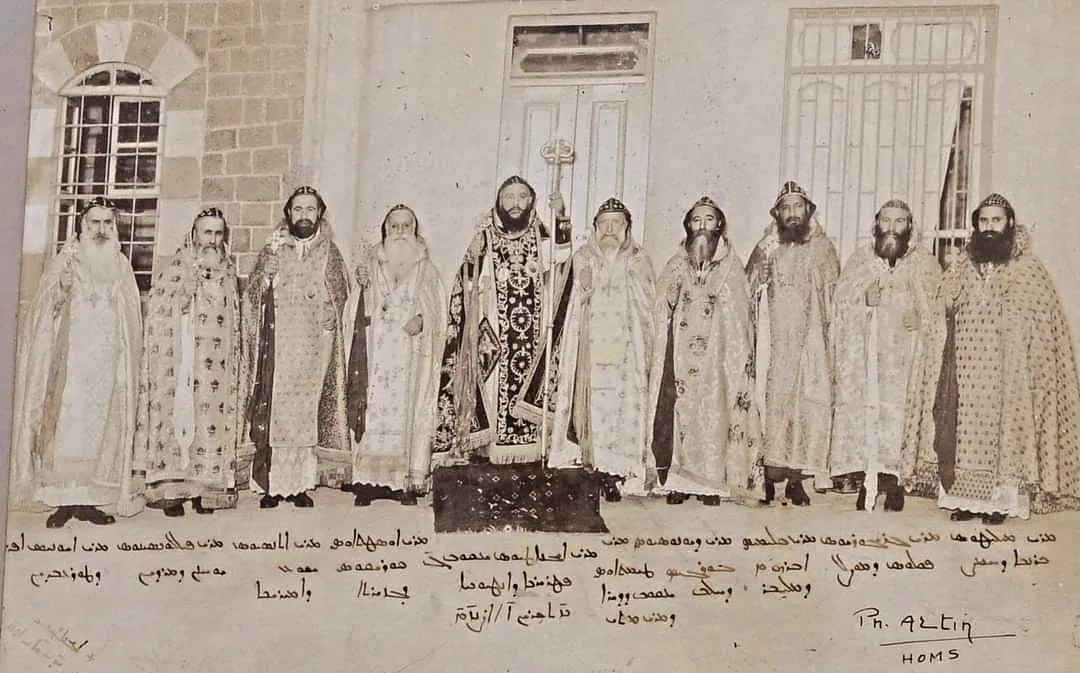
Syriac Orthodox Holy Synod for the inauguration of Patriarch Moran Mor Ignatius Yakup III in 1957, Homs, Syria.

Mor Ignatius Jacob (Yaʿqub) III (October 12, 1913 – June 26, 1980) was the 121st Syriac Orthodox Patriarch of Antioch and head of the Syriac Orthodox Church 1957–1980. He was skilled in and knowledgeable in Syriac sacral music or Beth Gazo. He re-established the Maphrianate/Catholicate in the Jacobite Syrian Orthodox Church (the Indian Church).

== Birth ==
Mor Ignatius Yaʿqub III was born on October 12, 1913, in the Touma Mari family of Bartalla village in Iraq.

== Ordinations ==
He was ordained deacon by Patriarch Ignatius Elias III and priest by Patriarch Ignatius Afram I Barsoum. He visited the Syriac Orthodox Church in Kerala, India, in 1933 as Rabban ʿAbdel Ahad where he served as a malphono (teacher) at the Mor Ignatios Dayro. In 1946, he returned to the Middle East to teach at the Mor Ephrem Seminary in Mosul and was ordained Metropolitan of Beirut and Damascus in 1950. In 1957, he was consecrated Patriarch after Patriarch Ignatius Afram I Barsoum died.

== Church in India ==
Patriarch Yaʿqub worked actively for cooperation among the Oriental Orthodox Churches and the reconciliation of the Church in India. In 1964, he visited Malankara and consecrated Augen Timotheous as Catholicos to establish peace in the church.

== Books ==
Patriarch Yaʿqub wrote at least thirty books about the history of the Church, spirituality and liturgy including a History of the Church until the 6th century, a History of the Syrian Church in India, a comparative study of Syriac and Arabic languages, and Personageaphies of Ephrem the Syrian, Philoxenus of Mabbug, and Yaʿqub of Serugh. Students of the church consider his lecture as an authoritative on the Syrian Orthodox Church at the University of Göttingen in 1971.

- History of the Syrian Church of India
- History of the Monastery of Saint Matthew in Mosul

== Syriac music ==
Patriarch Yaʿqub was skilled in and knowledgeable about Syriac music. He was endowed with a sharp memory that enabled him to memorize over 700 melodies of the Beth Gazo including variants (Shuhlophe). He had a voice of a "nightingale" as Patriarch Ignatius Zakka I Iwas tells us. He learned the Beth Gazo from another master of Syriac music, Mor Yulios Elias Qoro, then Patriarchal Delegate in India.

He was familiar with his native school of music in Iraq (the School of Takrit) as well as the more popular School of Mardin. During a five-month visit to the United States (from March 11 - August 15, 1960), Yaʿqub, at the request of Metropolitan Mor Athanasius Yeshuʿ Samuel, the archbishop of the United States and Canada, recorded the Beth Gazo according to the School of Mardin. This recording serves as the authoritative reference to the musical tradition of the School of Mardin. Patriarch Yaʿqub is remembered for his spiritually uplifting celebration of the liturgy. He encouraged many to accept the simple way of life. After he consecrated sacred myron in the Mor Gabriel monastery in 1964, myron flowed from the glass container the following day and people were healed by it.

== Episcopal succession ==
During Ignatius Yaʿqub's tenure as patriarch and metropolitan, he was responsible for ordaining and consecrating many metropolitans within the Syriac Orthodox Church, in addition to hundreds of priests, monks, and deacons. Two of these ordained were future patriarchs.

1. Severus Zakka (1963–1969). metropolitan of the Mosul Diocese, later metropolitan of Baghdad & Basrah Diocese (1969–1980). Later, he was elected as Ignatius Zakka I, the 122nd Patriarch of Syriac Orthodox Church (1980–2014).
2. Timothy Shlita (1958) Metropolitan
3. Dionysius Behnan Jijjawi (1959–1996). Metropolitan of Jerusalem
4. Cyril Jacob (1959) Metropolitan
5. Julius Paulus (1963) Metropolitan
6. Disocorius Luke Sha'ia (1963) Metropolitan
7. Athanasius Aphrem Barsoum (1965-2016). Metropolitan of Lebanon
8. Gregorios Saliba Shamoun (1969-2011). Metropolitan of Mosul
9. Severus Hawa (1970). Metropolitan
10. Timothy Aphrem Aboudi (1972) Metropolitan in Sweden and then Canada
11. Athanasius Paulus (1973). Metropolitan in India
12. Gregorios Goerge (1974). Metropolitan in India
13. Dionysius Thomas (1974). Metropolitan in India
14. Cyril Qeryaqus (1974). Metropolitan in India
15. Julius Jacob (1975). Metropolitan in India
16. Eustathios Thomas (1975). Metropolitan in India
17. Gregorios Yuhanna Ibraheem (1979). Metropolitan of Aleppo
18. Julius Yeshu Çiçek (1979-2005). Metropolitan of Central Europe
19. Phlixinous Matthew (1979)

== Death ==
Patriarch Yaʿqub died on June 26, 1980, and was buried in Cathedral of Saint George, Damascus in Damascus, Syria.

Preceded by Ignatius Aphrem I	Syriac Orthodox Patriarch of Antioch; 1957–1980	Succeeded by Ignatius Zakka I

== See also ==
- Syriac Orthodox Church
- List of Syriac Orthodox Patriarchs of Antioch - list from 1783
- Malankara Jacobite Syriac Orthodox Church
- The Malankara Orthodox Syrian Church
- Ignatius Zakka I Iwas
- Ignatius Afram I Barsoum
- Ignatius Elias III
