= Ignatius Abdullah I =

98th Patriarch of the Syriac Orthodox Church of Antioch (1521–1557)

- Syriac Orthodox Patriarch of Antioch and All the East
- Church: Syriac Orthodox Church
- See: Antioch
- Installed: 1521
- Term ended: 1557
- Predecessor: Ignatius David I
- Successor: Ignatius Ni'matallah

Personal details
- Died: 1557

Ignatius Abdullah I was the Patriarch of Antioch and head of the Syriac Orthodox Church from 1521 until his death in 1557. (Note: The patriarchate of Ignatius Abdullah I is alternatively placed in 1520–1556, or 1520/1521–1557. Also known as Ignatius Abdallah ben Istifan, Ignatius Abdullah I ben Stephanos, and Ignatius ʿAbdullāh I bar Sṭephanos. Alternatively spelt as ‘Abd Allah or Abdallah. He is also counted as Ignatius III Abdallah. (Syriac: ܥܒܕܗ ܕܐܠܗܐ ܐ ܕܡܢ ܚܣܢܐ ܕܐܢܬܬܐ).)

== Biography ==
Abdullah was born at Qalʿat Mara probably at the end of the fifteenth century. He became patriarch of Antioch in 1521. As patriarch, he moved the patriarchal residence from the Mor Hananyo Monastery to the Church of the Virgin Mary at Amid in response to attempts by Syriac laymen to intervene in the hierarchy of the church. In 1521 (AG 1832), Abdullah issued a document to attest that the Shamsīyah adhered to Syriac Orthodox beliefs and practices.

Abdullah convened a synod at the Mor Hananyo Monastery in 1523 to resolve a dispute between Yusuf al-Gurji, metropolitan of Jerusalem, Syria, ‘Ayn Ḥalyyā, ‘Ayn Ḥaūr, and half of Ṣadad, and Diyūsqūrūs ‘Īsā Ibn Ḥūriyyah, bishop of Dayr Mār Mūsā, Al-Nabek, Ṣālḥiyyah, and half of Ṣadad. (Note: The synod at the Mor Hananyo Monastery is placed in either 1521, or 1523.) The dispute concerned a marriage at Ṣadad in 1519 which had divided the villagers and the two bishops as ‘Īsā Ibn Ḥūriyyah approved of the wedding whereas Yusuf al-Gurji did not. However, the controversy escalated after ‘Īsā Ibn Ḥūriyyah took control of the diocese of Syria from Yusuf al-Gurji with a decree that he had received from Janbirdi al-Ghazali, who he had given 400 ašrafī, and Yusuf al-Gurji responded by retaking the diocese after having paid 70 ašrafī. The synod was attended by Basilius Habib, Maphrian of the East, Philoxenus Saliba, metropolitan of Cyprus, Timothy, bishop of the Patriarchal Office, Severus Bishara, metropolitan of Gargar, and Yusuf al-Gurji. Yusuf al-Gurji attended the synod on 28 January 1523. Abdullah issued canons in Arabic that allowed marriages up to the fifth degree.

Abdullah, with Philoxenus Faraj Allah, metropolitan of Amid, authenticated a document issued by Basil Iiya’ I, Maphrian of the East, dated 6 October 1542 (AG 1853), to confirm again that the Shamsīyah had accepted and conformed to Syriac Orthodox beliefs and practices. The monk priest Moses of Mardin was despatched by Abdullah with two copies of the Peshitta New Testament and a commendatory letter to Rome, where he arrived in or shortly before 1549, and was tasked with procuring printed Syriac Bibles or for the opportunity to produce them. Abdullah may have sent Moses in response to an invitation to send a delegate to the Council of Trent. It is debated as to whether Abdullah had directed Moses to negotiate union with the Catholic Church. Upon Moses' return, Abdullah entrusted him with a letter to the pope, written at the Mor Hananyo Monastery and dated 28 May 1551 (AG 1862), and a profession of faith to take back to Rome. Pope Julius III replied to Abdullah in a letter dated 26 May 1553. The Syriac New Testament was eventually printed by Moses with Johann Albrecht Widmannstetter and Guillaume Postel at Vienna in 1555, in which Abdullah was mentioned in the colophons. Abdullah served as patriarch until his death in 1557 and was buried in the mausoleum of the Mor Hananyo Monastery.

== Episcopal succession ==
As patriarch, Abdullah ordained the following bishops:

- Timothy Iiya’ I, metropolitan of the Patriarchal Office (1527)
- Basil Iiya’ I, Maphrian of the East (1533)
- Grīgūryūs Yūḥannā of Mardin, bishop of Jerusalem (1540)

== Bibliography ==
- Barsoum, Aphrem (2003). The Scattered Pearls: A History of Syriac Literature and Sciences. Translated by Matti Moosa (2nd ed.). Gorgias Press.
- Barsoum, Aphrem (2008). History of the Za'faran Monastery. Translated by Matti Moosa. Gorgias Press.
- Barsoum, Aphrem (2009). The Collected Historical Essays of Aphram I Barsoum. Vol. 1. Translated by Matti Moosa. Gorgias Press.
- Bcheiry, Iskandar (2004). "A List of the Syrian Orthodox Patriarchs between 16th and 18th Century: A Historical Supplement to Michael the Syrian's Chronicle in a MS. of Sadad". Parole de l'Orient. 29: 211–261.
- Borbone, Pier Giorgio (2017). ""Monsignore Vescovo di Soria", also known as Moses of Mardin, scribe and book collector". Christian Orient: Journal of Studies in the Christian Culture of Asia and Africa. 8: 79–114.
- Burleson, Samuel; Rompay, Lucas van (2011). "List of Patriarchs of the Main Syriac Churches in the Middle East". In Sebastian P. Brock; Aaron M. Butts; George A. Kiraz; Lucas Van Rompay (eds.). Gorgias Encyclopedic Dictionary of the Syriac Heritage. Piscataway, NJ: Gorgias Press. pp. 481–491.
- Briquel-Chatonnet, Françoise; Debié, Muriel (2023). The Syriac World: In Search of a Forgotten Christianity. Translated by Jeffrey Haines. Yale University Press.
- Dolabani, Philoxenos Yuhanon (1990). Die Patriarchen de syrisch-orthodoxen Kirche von Antiochen (in Syriac). Bar-Hebraeus Verlag.
- Kiraz, George A. (2011). "ʿAbdullāh I bar Sṭephanos". In Sebastian P. Brock; Aaron M. Butts; George A. Kiraz; Lucas Van Rompay (eds.). Gorgias Encyclopedic Dictionary of the Syriac Heritage. Piscataway, NJ: Gorgias Press. p. 4.
- Minnich, Nelson H. (2023). "The Organizational Structure of the Council of Trent". In Nelson H. Minnich (ed.). The Cambridge Companion to the Council of Trent. Cambridge University Press. pp. 32–52.
- Özcoşar, Ibrahim (2014). "Separation and conflict: Syriac Jacobites and Syriac Catholics in Mardin in the eighteenth and nineteenth centuries". Byzantine and Modern Greek Studies. 38 (2): 201–217.
- Rompay, Lucas Van (2011). "Mushe of Mardin". In Sebastian P. Brock; Aaron M. Butts; George A. Kiraz; Lucas Van Rompay (eds.). Gorgias Encyclopedic Dictionary of the Syriac Heritage. Piscataway, NJ: Gorgias Press. pp. 300–301.
- Wilkinson, Robert J. (2007). Orientalism, Aramaic and Kabbalah in the Catholic Reformation: The First Printing of the Syriac New Testament. Leiden, Netherlands: Brill.
- Wilmshurst, David (2019). "West Syrian patriarchs and maphrians". In Daniel King (ed.). The Syriac World. Routledge. pp. 806–813.

Preceded by Ignatius David I	Syriac Orthodox Patriarch of Antioch; 1521–1557	Succeeded by Ignatius Ni'matallah
