= Moses (bishop) =

Moses (Arabic: Musa, Armenian: Movses, Syriac: Mushe) is the name of several bishops:

- Moses, bishop of Phacusa in 325, Melitian
- Moses, bishop of the Arabs, died c. 389, Nicene
- Moses, bishop in Bagrevan in 470s–490s, Armenian
- Moses, bishop of Hamir in 486, Nestorian
- Moses, bishop of Piroz Shabur in 486, Nestorian
- Moses I, bishop of Nahargur in 497, Nestorian
- Moses, bishop of Beth Bgash in 544, Nestorian
- Moses, bishop of Karka d'Ledan in 576, Nestorian
- Moses II, bishop of Nahargur in 585, Nestorian
- Moses, bishop of Pelusium in the 7th century, Coptic
- Moses, bishop of Hermonthis after 600, Coptic
- Moses, bishop of Koptos c. 620, Coptic
- Moses, bishop of Nineveh in 659, Nestorian
- Moses, bishop of Awsim in 743–767, Coptic
- Moses, bishop of Taimana in 790, Nestorian
- Moses bar Kepha, died 903, Syriac Orthodox
- Moses, bishop of Qlaudia in 965×986, Syriac Orthodox
- Moses, bishop of Shigar in 1092, Nestorian
- Moses, bishop of Beth Nuhadra in 1111, Nestorian
- Moses, bishop of Erbil in 1281, Nestorian
- Moses of Mardin, died 1592, Syriac Orthodox
