= Moses of Mardin =

Assyrian scribe, emissary, and teacher of the Syriac Orthodox Church (d. 1592)

- Native name: ܡܘܫܐ ܕܡܪܕܝܢ
- Church: Syriac Orthodox Church
- See: Antioch

Orders
- Consecration: 1556 by Ignatius Niʿmatallah I
- Rank: Bishop

Personal details
- Born: early 16th century Qaluq, Tur Abdin
- Died: 1592 Rome
- Denomination: Syriac Orthodox Church

Moses of Mardin (Syriac: ܡܘܫܐ ܕܡܪܕܝܢ, romanized: Mūše d-Mārdīn; d. 1592), also called Moses al-Ṣawri, was a Syriac Orthodox cleric, scribe, teacher, and emissary. He is best known for his role in bringing Syriac Christian literature to the attention of European scholars, and producing the first printed edition of the Syriac New Testament (Peshitta) in Europe. During his travels across Europe, Moses taught Syriac, translated and copied numerous religious and philosophical texts, and engaged with prominent humanists and orientalists such as Johann Albrecht Widmanstetter, Andreas Masius and Guillaume Postel. His manuscripts and printed works laid the foundation for the study of Syriac literature in Europe and preserved key historical and liturgical texts of the Syriac Orthodox tradition.

== Early life ==
Moses was born to an Assyrian family in Qaluq, a village in the region of Ṣawro near Mardin, the son of a priest named Isaac. At the age of eight, he was bitten by a snake, which caused the loss of his right thumb and left his index finger permanently crooked.

=== Mission to Europe ===
Patriarch Ignatius Abdullah I bar Stephanos sent Moses to Europe with Syriac New Testament manuscripts and letters of recommendation, likely due to the patriarch's open attitudes toward communion, or at least positive ecumenical dialogue, with the Catholic Church. He arrived in Rome sometime before 1549 and was granted an audience with Pope Paul III. Paul sent him back to Mardin with a letter to the patriarch who then dispatched Moses again to Rome, this time with his confession of faith. By then Paul had died, so Moses presented the confession to his successor, Pope Julius III.

Moses's journey was hectic, spanning various parts of the world, including Mardin in southeastern Turkey, Cyprus, Egypt, Italy, Vienna, northern Germany, and possibly even England

While in Rome, Moses stayed at the Ethiopian monastery of San Stefano near the Vatican, where he befriended the monk Taṣfa Ṣejon (Petrus Aethiops) and worked on a Syriac translation of the Latin liturgy. He studied Latin and Italian while teaching Syriac, and came into contact with prominent orientalists including Guillaume Postel, Andreas Masius, and Johann Albrecht Widmanstetter. Moses also demonstrated a basic knowledge of Ethiopic. He reports that when he was in Rome, he saw with his own eyes "the mandila which was sent by our Lord to Abgar", specifying that it was located in the Church of the Apostles Peter and Paul; this is in reference to the Doctrine of Addai.

Moses sought to establish a Syriac printing press in Rome, securing partial financial backing from then-Cardinal and Vatican librarian Marcello Cervini, who gave him 13 gold scudi; however, the support proved inadequate to fully realize the printing project. In addition to his priestly status being doubted, Moses left Rome, arriving in northern Germany with one of the NT Syriac manuscripts where he partnered with Widmanstetter, who had long been interested in Syriac studies. Widmanstetter, who had been charged by Teseo Ambrogio to study Syriac, "the language hallowed by the blessed lips of Christ", managed to get Moses an audience with Ferdinand, King of Hungary and Bohemia, who supported the projected and led the two to produce the first printed Syriac New Testament in Vienna in 1555. In Austria, Emperor Ferdinand granted him a coat of arms, a gift Moses excitedly reported to Masius. He also expressed hope that Europe would defeat the Ottoman Empire, which he saw as divine justice against Turkish domination. Moses resided in the Jesuit hall at Am Hof Square in Vienna.

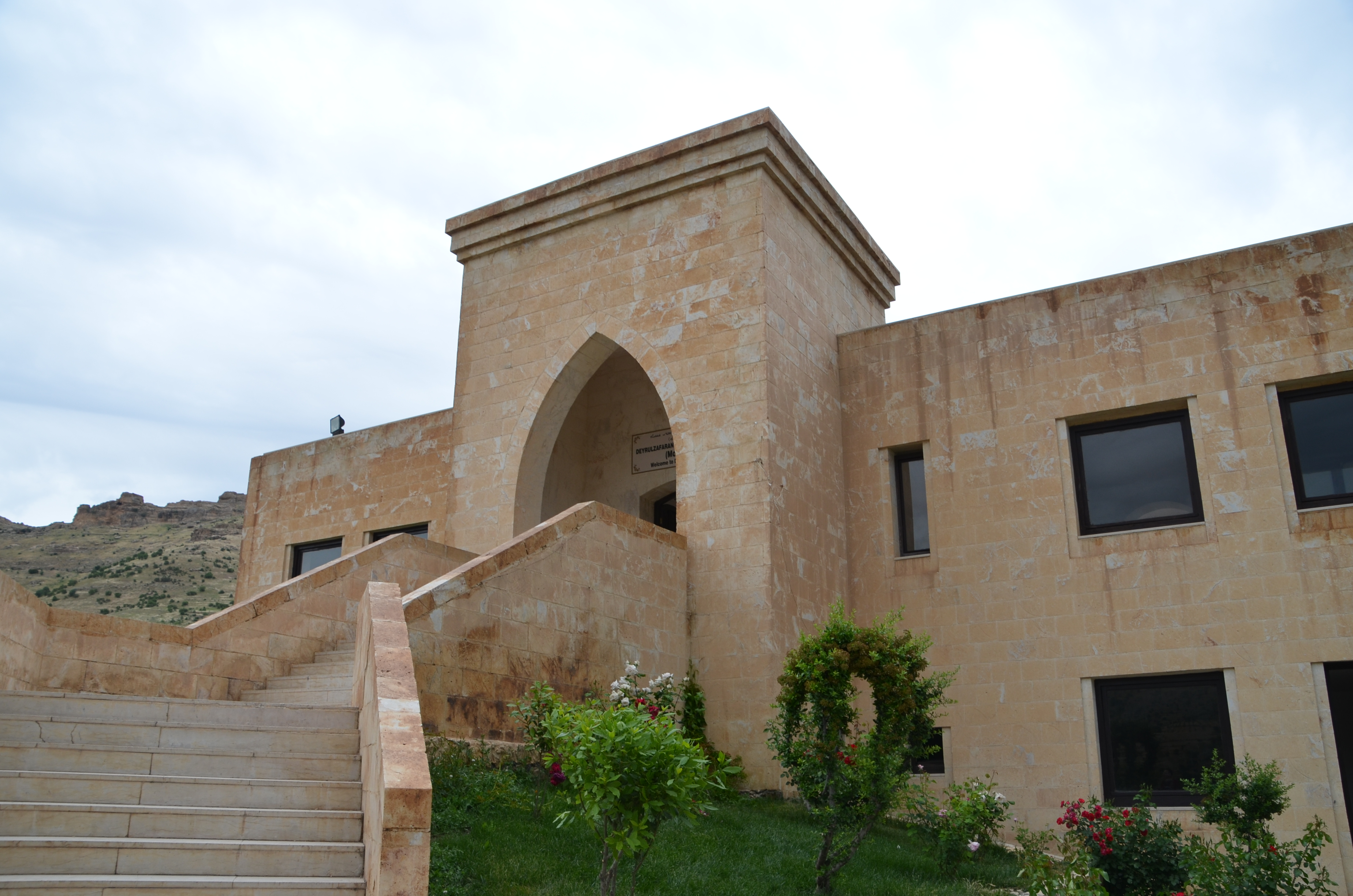
The Syriac Orthodox monastery of Mor Hananyo in Tur Abdin

Moses provided models for the type, drawing each Serṭo character in his elegant handwriting for the engravers, who engraved the typeface for the press based on his handwriting. The colophon is dated September 27, 1555. About 1,000 copies were printed: 500 for Europe, 300 for the Syriac Orthodox and Maronite patriarchs, and 200 for Moses, who distributed them to various Eastern churches, including the patriarch of the Church of the East. While Dolabani later claimed that copies were kept at the Mor Hananyo Monastery near Mardin, none have been found; they may have been moved to the Church of the Forty Martyrs nearby.

The edition circulated widely. Azariah dei Rossi utilized this works for clarifying what he perceived as corrupt or obscure passages in the New Testament Vulgate, particularly those containing Aramaic expressions. To support his argument, he analyzed seventeen Gospel passages with Aramaic words, presenting each first in the Latin Vulgate, then in Syriac (using Serṭo script and cursive Hebrew and Latin transcription), and finally in his own Italian translation. Dei Rossi primarily used Teseo Ambrogio degli Albonesi’s Introductio as a resource for learning Syriac, which he viewed as merely a different alphabet for writing Aramaic, while also referencing Widmanstetter’s Elementa.

Some editions included the entire New Testament, while others contained only the Gospels, sometimes accompanied by Widmanstetter’s Elementa (1555–56), a Syriac primer. On his return journey to Mardin, Moses sold copies along the way, including in Famagusta, Cyprus, in October 1556.

Moses accompanied Patriarch Ignatius Niʿmatallah I (1557–1576) on his flight from Mesopotamia to Rome, undertaken due to increasing persecution of Christians by the Muslims in the Ottoman Empire. In Rome, they met Pope Gregory XIII (1572–1585), where Moses assisted his patriarch in communicating with the Italians. From 1581 to 1585, Moses taught Arabic and Syriac at the Collegio dei Neofiti in Rome. He continued to teach Syriac, serving as a tutor to Andreas Masius and other humanists, and maintained correspondence in Syriac with Masius. Moses returned to Mardin around 1556, where he continued copying manuscripts, including finishing his copy of the Chronicle of Michael the Great (now lost, but the copy Moses made underlies the only surviving witness). He also copied and translated numerous works, including Syriac liturgical texts, biblical books, philosophical works (such as Aristotle via Jacob of Edessa), and other historical chronicles besides Michael's. Several manuscripts copied by Moses survive, including Harley MS 5512 (British Library), containing parts of the Roman Missal in Serṭo with Syriac anaphoras, written for the Ethiopian convent in Rome.

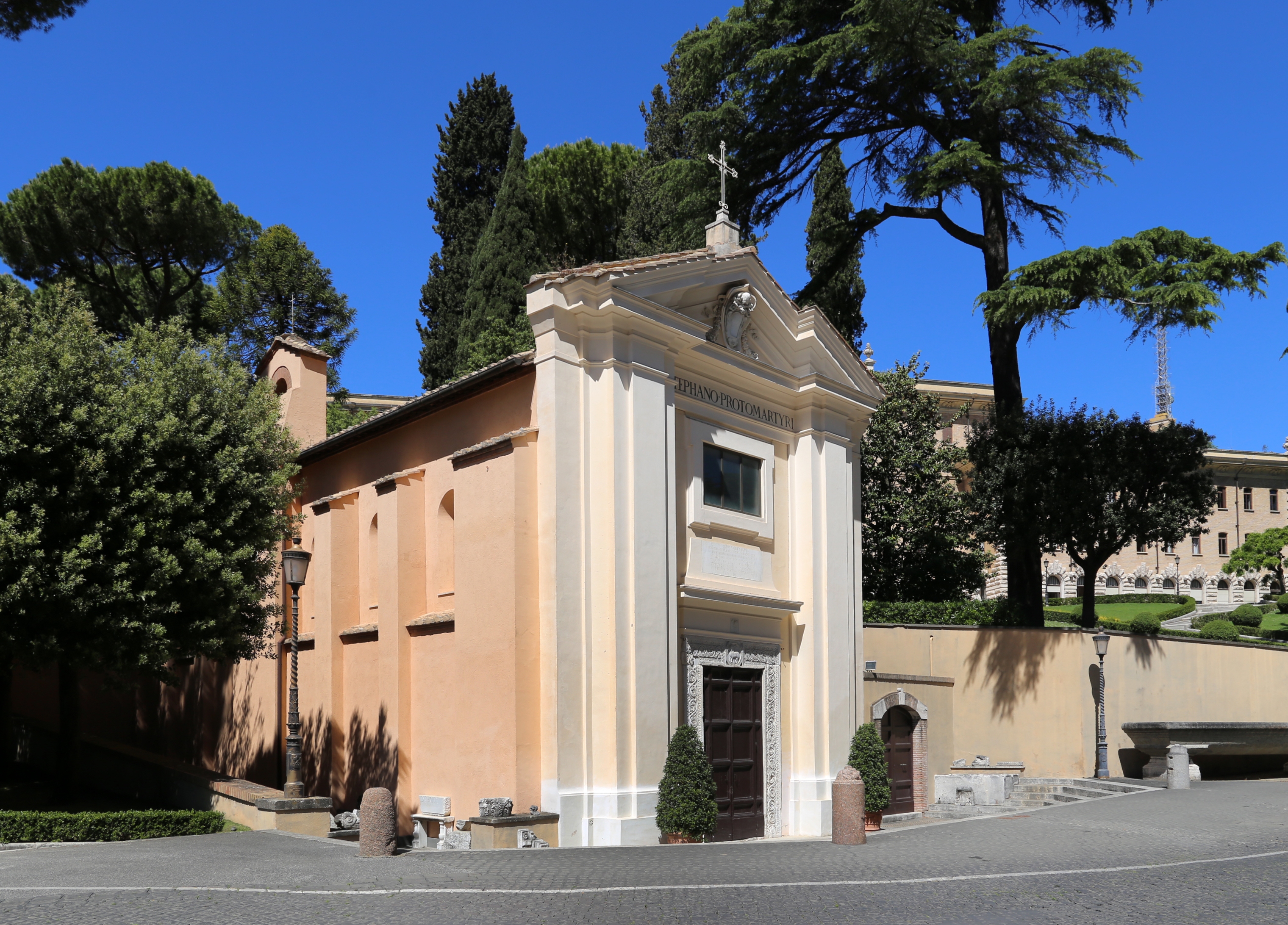
Santo Stefano degli Abissini, where Moses spent much of his time in the Vatican

Moses is last recorded in Rome in 1578, accompanying Patriarch Niʿmatallah to the papal court. He copied manuscripts in the 1580s and is thought to have died in or shortly after 1592, possibly in Rome.

== Claims of excommunication and defrocking ==
There exists seemingly contradicting accounts of Moses's life, specifically with regards to whether he was truly ordained a priest and/or bishop, and whether he converted to Catholicism in Europe.

=== Evidence of ordination/defrocking ===
Critics of his episcopal status point to a letter from Patriarch Ignatius Niʿmatallah, who denounced Moses as a "slanderer" and declared him excommunicated, accusing him of falsely presenting himself as a prelate. Andreas Masius also expressed doubts, questioning Moses’s use of a priestly cross on his seal and implying that he may not have held valid clerical rank. He also sometimes overstated his ecclesiastical position.

On the other hand, several sources affirm that Moses was consecrated bishop by Niʿmatallah himself, or at least recognized as such in certain circles. His contemporary correspondence sometimes bears episcopal signatures and titles, and he was granted the honor of a coat of arms by Emperor Ferdinand, a distinction usually reserved for ecclesiastical dignitaries.

=== Evidence of conversion/steadfastness ===
Moses presented a profession of faith in Rome in which he affirmed both the Filioque and the Council of Chalcedon — doctrines contrary to those espoused by the Oriental Orthodox Churches, of which the Syriac Orthodox Church is part of. He also made use of eight honorific epithets for the Pope of Rome. Generally, Moses does not view the Pope as a heresiarch or the Catholic Church as a schismatic institution; instead, he blames the status quo on the "enemy of man", meaning Satan.

While it may be implied that he had converted to Catholicism, this is unlikely. Despite the confession he made to the Pope, he resisted ordination as a Catholic priest and referred to the Roman prelates as "lacking love and desiring vain glory". Furthermore, it was customary for any Christian — Roman Catholic or otherwise — to give similar confessions to the Pope upon meeting him. Moses's name is also absent from any Jesuit sources, which would have included it had he been ordained in Vienna. Moreover, self-designations supporting his Syriac Orthodox faith frequently appear, such as "Jacobite" and "Syriac Orthodox", in addition to referring to the Syriac Orthodox Church and its patriarch as his or his people's.

András Mércz provides reasons why Moses, writing exclusively in Latin and not Syriac, may have used terms that seem to support a Catholic leaning: he was concerned that his printing press project would go up in flames, as there was a purge occurring among various Jewish documents in Hebrew and Yiddish being burned, and his Syriac works might face the same fate. At the same time, this may also reflect his desire for unity between his Church and the Latin Church.

== Works ==
Moses’s own works include:

- Roman Missa
- Syriac Anaphorae, including Bet Gazzā and "Vescovo di Soria" (1580)
- Three copies of the Syriac Orthodox ritual of baptism translated into Arabic
- Psalms (Peshitta)
- Encheiridion of the Four Gospels
- Book of Ezekiel (Syriac version by Jacob of Edessa)
- Ben Sira
- John’s Revelation
- A collection of various homilies
- Michael the Great’s Chronicle (lost, but known through a copy of a copy he made)
- Bar Hebraeus’s Metrical Grammar
- Dictionarium Syriacae Linguae cum interpretatione Arabica & Latina, with Greek where needed
- Various fragments of Syriac-Arabic vocabulary bound together
- Life of Aristotle
- Translation of Aristotle’s Categories by Jacob of Edessa and commentary on the Isagoge
- Manuscript of calendrical tables for Cardinal Antonio Carafa, probably around 1582

His efforts provided the first opportunity for Western scholars to study Syriac Christian literature directly and laid the foundation for Syriac studies in Europe.

== See also ==
- Giuseppe Luigi Assemani
- Miaphysitism
- List of Assyrians
- List of Syriac writers
- Printing press

== Source ==
- Widmannstetter, Johann Albrecht; Moses (2006). Kiraz, George Anton (ed.). The Widmanstadt-Moses Editio Princeps of the Syriac Gospels of 1555. Facs. limited ed., 1. Gorgias Press ed. (1st ed.). Piscataway, NJ: Gorgias Press. ISBN 978-1-59333-999-9.
- Kessel, Grigory (2016-09-13). "Wonders of Creation: Ottoman Manuscripts from Hamburg Collection". Centre for the Study of Manuscript Cultures. Chapter 5.1: Moses of Mardin (d. 1592).
- Dinno, Khalid S. (2017). The Syrian Orthodox Christians in the Late Ottoman Period and Beyond: Crisis, Then Revival. Gorgias Eastern Christian studies. Piscataway (N.J.): Gorgias Press, LLC. ISBN 978-1-4632-0575-1.
- Mércz, András (2022). The Syriac correspondence of Andreas Masius and Moses of Mardin (Thesis). Pázmány Péter Katolikus Egyetem. doi:10.15774/ppke.btk.2022.006.
- Rompay, Lucas Van (2011). Brock, Sebastian P.; Butts, Aaron Michael; Kiraz, George A.; Rompay, Lucas Van (eds.). Gorgias Encyclopedic Dictionary of the Syriac Heritage. Gorgias Press, LLC. ISBN 9781593337148.
- Emanuel, Fiano (2011). Brock, Sebastian P.; Butts, Aaron Michael; Kiraz, George A.; Rompay, Lucas Van (eds.). Gorgias Encyclopedic Dictionary of the Syriac Heritage. Gorgias Press, LLC. ISBN 9781593337148.
- Saint-Laurent, Jeanne-Nicole Mellon (2015). Missionary Stories and the Formation of the Syriac Churches (1 ed.). University of California Press. ISBN 978-0-520-28496-8. JSTOR 10.1525/j.ctt19632bn.
- Johnson, Dale A. (2010). Syriac Influences in Western History. Lulu.com. ISBN 978-0-557-41638-7.
- Mércz, András (28 August 2019). "The Coat of Arms of Moses of Mardin". Hugoye: Journal of Syriac Studies. Pázmány Péter Catholic University Avicenna Institute of Middle Eastern Studies: 345–393. Archived from the original on 2025-03-27.
- Borbone, Pier Giorgio (2017). Piotrovsky, Mikhail B. (ed.). "Monsignore Vescovo di Soria, also Known as Moses of Mardin, Scribe and Book Collector". Journal of Studies in the Christian Culture of Asia and Africa. 8: 79–114.
