= Ignatius Ni'matallah =

99th Patriarch of Syriac Orthodox Church of Antioch (1557–1576)

Ignatius Niʿmatallah
- Syriac Orthodox Patriarch of Antioch and All the East
- Church: Syriac Orthodox Church
- See: Antioch
- Installed: 1557
- Term ended: 1576
- Predecessor: Ignatius Abdullah I
- Successor: Ignatius David II Shah

Personal details
- Born: c. 1515 Mardin, Ottoman Empire
- Died: 29 May 1587 Bracciano, Papal States

Ignatius Niʿmatallah was the Patriarch of Antioch and head of the Syriac Orthodox Church from 1557 until his resignation in 1576. (Note: Niʿmatallah is counted as Ignatius XVII. Also known as Neemas of Mardin or simply Ni'mah. Alternatively spelt as Ni'mat Allāh or Niʿmatullāh. (Arabic: البطرك نعمة اللّٰه; Latin: Nehemias; Syriac: ܦܛܪܝܪܟܐ ܢܥܡܗ̈ ܐܠܗ, romanized: Ṭaybutheh d-Aloho).)

== Biography ==
=== Early life ===
Niʿmatallah was born at Mardin in c. 1515 and was the son of Maqdisi Yūḥannā (John) and Hissin. He had brothers named David Shah, (Note: David Shah is interpreted as either Niʿmatallah's nephew, or as his brother.) Thomas, Mina, and Constantine. His father Yūḥannā was the son of Muglah and Nūr al-Dīn, brother of Patriarch Ignatius John XIV (r. 1484–1493). Through Nūr al-Dīn, Niʿmatallah was the great-grandson of Šay Allāh, son of Sa‘d al-Dīn; his paternal ancestors had moved from Bartella, near Mosul, to Mardin in the mid-14th century, and were descended from the priest Abū al-Karam, who lived in the thirteenth or fourteenth centuries. At Mardin, Niʿmatallah was educated in theology, history, logic, astronomy, medicine, philosophy, and geodesy, and he also studied painting and Syriac literature.

He became a monk at the nearby Mor Hananyo Monastery in 1535, and was ordained as a priest. At this time, Niʿmatallah collaborated with Abdisho, Chaldean bishop of Gazarta, on the latter's copy of Bar Hebraeus' Metrical Grammar, completed 18 August 1552. He was later appointed as Maphrian of the East in 1555, upon which he assumed the name Basil. In 1557, after the death of Patriarch Ignatius Abdullah I, Niʿmatallah was elected as his successor, probably at a synod held at the Mor Hananyo Monastery. He was thus consecrated as patriarch of Antioch, upon which he assumed the name Ignatius and made his residence at Amida (modern Diyarbakır), but also administered the dioceses of Edessa and Damascus. Niʿmatallah's brother Thomas, who had ascended as bishop of Mardin with the name Timothy in 1556, would go on to fulfil the role of his deputy.

=== Patriarch of Antioch ===
As patriarch, Niʿmatallah actively pursued communion with the Roman Catholic Church, as first shown by the dispatch of the bishop John Cassa Qasha and monk Abdel to Rome in 1560 or 1561–1562 with a letter expressing his desire to establish communion between the two churches. This was met with success in that the embassy returned to Niʿmatallah with letters that welcomed him and the church into communion with the Roman Catholic Church. In 1562, Niʿmatallah underwent a pilgrimage to Jerusalem with his brother Thomas, and whilst en route they visited the monastery of Saint Moses the Abyssinian near Al-Nabek in Syria.

Niʿmatallah maintained contact with the papacy in subsequent years and sent messengers to Pope Pius IV in 1562–1565, but this was met by demands for the patriarch to make an explicit declaration of faith. Further efforts at strengthening the union between the patriarch and pope was frayed by issues in communication as four messengers sent by Niʿmatallah to Rome failed to reach their destination. (Note: The first messenger, a vicar named John, was sent to convince the Coptic Pope Gabriel VII of Alexandria to enter into communion with the Roman Catholic Church before he was to travel to Rome, but was eaten by a crocodile in the Nile by Alexandria in 1565. The second messenger, another vicar named John, died of plague at Constantinople in 1567. The third messenger's journey was frustrated by the Turkish wars. Isaac, the fourth messenger, was arrested, tortured, and killed by the Ottoman authorities in 1571 on suspicion of being a Habsburg spy amidst the War of Cyprus.) In a letter dated 28 February 1565, Pope Pius IV informed Niʿmatallah of the decrees of the Council of Trent and also of the appointment of Giovanni Battista Abissino as bishop of the Ethiopians in Cyprus, who was to act as intermediary between Rome and the eastern churches. He enjoyed greater success in internal affairs, as he restored unity within the church amidst the ongoing schism between the rival patriarchates of Antioch and Tur Abdin in 1572 after he had brought the latter under his authority. Niʿmatallah served as patriarch of Antioch until 1576, in which year he abdicated or was forced to abdicate under controversial circumstances. Whilst in office, he consecrated nineteen bishops.

On the one hand, it is argued that Niʿmatallah was forced to resign as patriarch and convert to Islam on threat of death by the Ottoman authorities as a consequence of his contacts with the Roman Catholic Church. Whereas others assert that, whilst at Amida, Niʿmatallah had gained the favour of the city's governor, and was appointed as his private physician, ostensibly on account of his expertise in Islamic medicine. This earned him the enmity of local Muslims, who resented a Christian holding such a position of power at the governor's court, and a number of Muslim notables wished to have the patriarch executed. As a result, on 10 March 1576, the governor placed his own turban atop Niʿmatallah's head, and announced that this act signified his conversion to Islam, to the delight of his Muslim courtiers.

In order to save himself from the Muslims' wrath, Niʿmatallah opted not to deny the governor's announcement of his conversion, but in doing so traded enemies as he then became the object of his former co-religionists' fury. Fearing for his life, Niʿmatallah abdicated on 28 March 1576, arranged for his brother David to succeed him as patriarch, and fled in secret with a large collection of Arabic manuscripts in his possession to a monastery near Sivas. Niʿmatallah thus entered into exile with his companions, (Note: Moses of Mardin is counted amongst Niʿmatallah's companions into exile by Van Rompay, however this is refuted by Borbone.) fleeing to Venice, likely via Cyprus or Rhodes, during which he noted in an elementary mathematical text:

With the aid of the inspiration from the Mighty Lord we were able to solve these problems on Sunday, after twenty days of October of the Greek year 1888 (1576 AD) have passed, when I the lost soul, by the name of Patriarch Ni‘meh, was on the ship tossed by the waves of the sea on my way to Venice.

=== Exile to Italy ===
Niʿmatallah's arrival at Venice is placed in October or November 1576. Here, Niʿmatallah, with no knowledge of Italian or Latin, made the acquaintance of Paolo Orsini, a former Turkish soldier and convert to Christianity, who then acted as his interpreter. As attested in Niʿmatallah's letter to his former co-religionists (MS Orientali 458), he and his party were joined by a former Syriac Orthodox clergyman named Moses, identified as Moses of Mardin, who had been excommunicated and fled from Egypt to Venice, but was acquitted by the former patriarch. They were forced to remain at Venice for eleven months due to plague until their eventual departure on 3 December 1577, prior to which Niʿmatallah received a letter of recommendation from Giovanni Grimani, patriarch of Aquileia, dated 7 November 1577, addressed to Cardinal Gugliemo Sirleto. The letter, in which he was praised for his piety and wisdom, has been interpreted to suggest Niʿmatallah had fled to the west with no documents nor letters of recommendation from European consuls in the east.

Their journey to Rome by way of Florence lasted nineteen days. (Note: The cataloguing of the Syriac manuscripts of the Syriac collection of the Laurentian Library at Florence in 2008–2011 brought forward further information on Niʿmatallah's life which had previously been uncertain. Thus historians offered differing dates for his arrival in Rome, e.g. Barsoum places Niʿmatallah's arrival in Rome in October 1576. Kiraz gives Niʿmatallah's arrival at some point between the end of 1576 and the beginning of 1578. Hamilton dates Niʿmatallah's arrival to late 1578 or early 1579.) Niʿmatallah's group also consisted of three deacons, including ‘Abdannur and the son of the brother of deacon Barsauma, and ‘Abd Alih son of Amir Aziz, whilst two companions, namely a certain Kaspar and Ne‘me remained at Venice, to sell their possessions and train as an apprentice craftsman, respectively. Issues arose amongst the group as ‘Abd Alih was caught stealing repeatedly, for which he was cast out and eventually executed at Rome for the murder of a Persian merchant, and similarly Moses was dismissed for his 'wickedness', to which he responded by slandering the group.

Soon after his arrival in Rome, Niʿmatallah seems to have met with Leonard Abel, whose work on the theological and ritual differences between the Syriac Orthodox and Roman Catholic churches, named Opiniones et Articuli aliquot, quos revelavit R.mus Neemet Alla Jacobinor(um) Patriarcha, in quibus natio illa in p(raesentiar(um) versatur, was likely produced at this time. Niʿmatallah also caught the attention of Cardinal Giulio Antonio Santorio, and he attended an audience with Santorio on 20 January 1578. Niʿmatallah was interviewed about his intentions in Rome by Santorio with three other experts, including Leonard Abel, who subsequently entered into the former patriarch's service as his procurator. As protector of the College of the Neophytes, Santorio was concerned with the relationship between the papacy and the eastern churches, and after having deemed Niʿmatallah suitable, arranged financial support and lodgings for him. With Santorio's support, Niʿmatallah was received by Pope Gregory XIII on 30 January.

=== Eastern missions ===
Gregory was initially reluctant to deal with Niʿmatallah as he preferred to continue negotiations on the establishment of a union between the Roman Catholic Church and the Syriac Orthodox Church with the latter's incumbent patriarch, Ignatius David II Shah, Niʿmatallah's brother and successor, with whom he had had some success in his correspondence.

Amidst Yeshaq's rebellion against the Ethiopian Emperor Sarsa Dengel, Niʿmatallah wrote to both rebel and emperor in an effort to achieve peace between the two and also to induce their submission to the Roman Catholic Church. In his letter to Sarsa Dengel, he mentioned that he had sent letters twice beforehand and also noted his unsuccessful attempt to arrange a meeting with Coptic Pope John XIV of Alexandria at Jerusalem in early 1575 to discuss the issue, but this had been prevented from taking place by 'men of the Devil'. Ultimately, nothing came of Niʿmatallah's efforts as Yeshaq was defeated and killed on 21 December 1578, and Sarsa Dengel showed little interest in conversion to Catholicism.

Niʿmatallah's presence in Rome encouraged Santorio to propose a mission to the eastern churches to the pope in April 1581, and Niʿmatallah also proposed the despatch of a bishop to Syria during an audience with Pope Gregory in May 1582. Leonard Abel was thus appointed titular bishop of Sidon on 19 August 1582 and nuncio in Syriae, Mesopotamiae, Assiriae, et Aegypti ac aliis Orientibus regionibus on 30 October 1582. Abel left for the east on 12 March 1583 and arrived at Aleppo by July, accompanied by the Jesuits Leonardo de Sant Angelo, Ignatius de las Casas, and Juan Francisco Lanci.

Confident in the success of the mission, a pallium was brought to be conferred on Ignatius David II Shah upon confirmation of union, however, the patriarch refused to meet with Abel as the monks of the monastery at which he resided, near Amida, opposed the meeting. Eventually, Abel met with a patriarchal delegate at the monastery of Mar 'Abiahi near Gargar, and Niʿmatallah's letter and several documents on the subject of the Council of Chalcedon were conveyed to the delegate. Negotiations went poorly as the delegate responded with outrage to the Catholic condemnation of Pope Dioscorus I of Alexandria, the suggestion of the adoption of the Gregorian calendar was rejected, and the meeting was ended prematurely after rumours spread that Abel had brought weapons and funds to start an insurrection.

Concurrent with the Jesuit Giovanni Battista Eliano's mission to the Coptic church, which had left for Egypt in September 1582, Niʿmatallah was granted authority to organise a mission of his own to Pope John XIV of Alexandria to negotiate union, and thus the Ethiopian priest Giovanni Maria Abissino, also known as Kefla Maryam, and the Florentine merchant Giovanni Battista Vecchietti were sent to Alexandria with Giovanni Battista Britti and arrived in July 1584.

=== Calendar reform ===
As a renowned scholar and theologian, Niʿmatallah was recruited by Pope Gregory XIII to join the papal commission on calendar reform, and he began work on 17 July 1579; his participation in the commission is also interpreted to reflect his perceived future usefulness in the promulgation of the new calendar amongst the eastern churches. The commission, formed with the purpose of the correction of the Julian calendar so to fulfil the demand for reform as implied by the last session of the Council of Trent on 4 December 1563, had operated since 1575 or as early as 1572, and had issued its proposals in the Compendium novae rationis restituendi Kalendarium (Compendium of a New Way of Restoring the Calendar) in 1577.

Niʿmatallah worked on his treatise in response to the commission's compendium, which was eventually completed at some point between the end of 1579 and the beginning of 1580. A Latin translation was prepared by Leonard Abel with a preface dedicated to Pope Gregory XIII, dated 12 March 1580. Niʿmatallah signed the commission's final report alongside his colleagues on 14 September 1580 in Syriac and Arabic with a Latin translation of his signature provided by Leonard Abel. The Gregorian calendar was decreed in the papal bull Inter gravissimas on 24 February 1582.

=== Medici Press ===
In 1578, an agreement was struck between Cardinal Ferdinando de Medici and Niʿmatallah whereby the former patriarch exchanged his collection of manuscripts for a monthly stipend of twenty-five scudi and free access to the collection for the rest of his life. The historian George Saliba suggests that Niʿmatallah had encountered Medici during his journey from Venice to Rome or more likely at his destination, whereas the historians Pier Giorgio Borbone and Margherita Farina have noted there is no evidence of such a meeting and argue it is unlikely the former patriarch and cardinal met in person.

Medici, following his appointment as Cardinal Protector of Antioch, Alexandria, and Ethiopia by Pope Gregory XIII in 1584, committed himself to the global expansion of Catholicism, and in doing so provided the funds for the Medici Oriental Press, founded at Rome on 6 March 1584 with the pope's support. In its foundation act, signed by Medici on 1 May 1584, it is attested that Giovanni Battista Raimondi had proposed the creation of a new printing press after consulting Niʿmatallah. The Medici Press was founded with the intention of printing biblical texts in Arabic and other languages for the purpose of the promotion of Catholicism amongst Muslims and eastern Christians. Raimondi held the position of director and curator of the new printing press from its foundation to his death in 1614.

=== Later life and death ===
Niʿmatallah corresponded with the French scholar Joseph Justus Scaliger in two long letters, which served as Scaliger's source of information on the Chinese zodiac and the Syrian calendar, amongst other subjects. In De emendatione temporum, Scaliger noted his appreciation for his correspondence with Niʿmatallah in several instances, and quoted from his letter. Scaliger also received a Syriac Apocalypse (MS Heb. Scaligeri 18 at Leiden in the Netherlands), transcribed by Gasparo Indiano, from Niʿmatallah. He met with Michel de Montaigne on 13 March 1581, and gave him a medical remedy.

Niʿmatallah is last mentioned in Santorio's diaries in February 1586, and he died on 29 May 1587 at Bracciano, as indicated in a manuscript by Giovanni Battista Raimondi. Niʿmatallah's death is placed in 1590 by eastern sources.

== Works ==
=== Miscellanea ===
At Rome, he prepared a text on the ceremonies and rituals of the Syriac Orthodox Church, in which he translated the Liturgy of Saint James into Arabic and compiled a list of the church's anaphoras, which was then translated by Paolo Orsini (Latin: Paulus Ursinus Constantinopolitanus) into Latin in collaboration with Antony Trancosa, who provided theological and liturgical support, dated 13 December 1578. The manuscript, named Caeremoniae communes ad omnes missas quibus Chaldaei utunturet missa S.Iacobi fratris domini et primi episc. Ierosolymitani, ex lingua chaldea in arabicam per R. Dom. Ignatium patriarcham Antiochenum, nominee quondam fratrem Naaman ord. S. Antonii et civem Mardinensem, et inde in Latinam conversae per doctorem Antonium Trancosam theologum Ill.mi et R.mi D Card. D. Iacobi Boncompagni, interprete Paulo Ursino, iussu Ill.mi et R.mi D. Card. S. Severinae, was written with the intention of polemical use against Protestants, and is now kept in the Bibliotheca Alexandrina in Rome.

In 1577–1578, he prepared a report on the Chaldean Catholic Church, in which he claimed to have received his information first-hand from Abdisho of Gazarta himself at the time that the latter had sought refuge with him, and that he had been asked to act as a mediator between the Chaldeans and Nestorians.

Niʿmatallah made a painting of the Virgin Mary, which he engifted with a small piece of the True Cross to the Syriac Orthodox Church, both of which are still kept at the Church of Saint Mary at Diyarbakır.

=== Calendar reform ===
Niʿmatallah's treatise in response to the Compendium novae rationis restituendi Kalendarium of 1577 was written in Garshuni in a small book (210x150mm, 55 folios) and consisted of twenty-two sections in which he extolled his criticism of the proposed reforms, followed by calendric tables and a perpetual calendar (MS Orientali 301). He worked on the treatise from 17 July 1579 until some point between the end of the year and the beginning of 1580, and now forms part of the collection of the Laurentian Library at Florence. Leonard Abel's Latin translation, dated 12 March 1580, is kept in the Vatican Archives (MS Fondo Bolognetti 315). In his criticism, he reportedly added Bar Hebraeus as an ecclesiastical authority in addition to earlier authorities, namely the Didascalia Apostolorum, Eusebius of Caesarea, and Gregory of Nyssa.

Niʿmatallah wrote a letter addressed to the Syriac Orthodox Church entitled On the investigation of the chronōn kanōn or the 532-year cycle, in which he detailed his belief in the necessity of calendar reform and stressed the role he had played in achieving the completion of the Gregorian calendar. His argument for the method by which the date of Easter should be calculated made use of citations of the First Council of Nicaea, Eusebius of Caesarea, and Bar Hebraeus' Ascent of the Mind. Whilst the piece's author is not provided in the manuscript, it was attributed to Niʿmatallah by the historian Aphrem Barsoum, who possessed a copy of the letter; additional copies are also appended to the manuscripts Yale Syriac 7 and Berlin Sachau 81.

=== Collection ===
Niʿmatallah's collection consisted of over one hundred manuscripts, and was acquired by Ferdinando de Medici in 1586. A catalogue was compiled by Marco Dobelo in c. 1610, a copy of which came into the possession of the English astronomer John Bainbridge by December 1632. It contained a compendium of Apollonius' Conics in Arabic by Al-Isfahani that included books V–VII that had been lost in the original Greek. He also possessed a copy of a 13th-century Persian Diatessaron, dated 21 November 1547 (MS Or. 81). A copy of the first part of the Ecclesiastical History of Bar Hebraeus (MS Or. 366) formed part of the collection and is noted in the list of Niʿmatallah's books (MS Cl. III 102).

== Episcopal succession ==
As patriarch, Niʿmatallah ordained the following bishops:

- Iyawannis, bishop of the Monastery of Mar Malke (1560)
- Ghazal, metropolitan of Se’ert (c. 1570)

== Bibliography ==
- Barsoum, Aphrem (2003). The Scattered Pearls: A History of Syriac Literature and Sciences. Translated by Matti Moosa (2nd ed.). Gorgias Press.
- Barsoum, Aphrem (2008a). History of the Za'faran Monastery. Translated by Matti Moosa. Gorgias Press.
- Barsoum, Aphrem (2008b). The History of Tur Abdin. Translated by Matti Moosa. Gorgias Press.
- Barsoum, Aphrem (2009). The Collected Historical Essays of Aphram I Barsoum. Vol. 1. Translated by Matti Moosa. Gorgias Press.
- Bcheiry, Iskandar (2004). "A List of the Syrian Orthodox Patriarchs between 16th and 18th Century: A Historical Supplement to Michael the Syrian's Chronicle in a MS. of Sadad". Parole de l'Orient. 29: 211–261.
- Bcheiry, Iskandar (2010). A List of Syriac Orthodox Ecclesiastic Ordinations from the Sixteenth and Seventeenth Century: The Syriac Manuscript of Hunt 444 (Syr 68 in Bodleian Library, Oxford). Gorgias Press.
- Bcheiry, Iskandar (2013). The Account of the Syriac Orthodox Patriarch Yūḥanun Bar Šay Allāh (1483–1492): The Syriac Manuscript of Cambridge: DD.3.8(1). Gorgias Press.
- Borbone, Pier Giorgio (2013). "Syriac and Garshuni Manuscripts Produced in Rome in the Collection of the Biblioteca Medicea Laurenziana, Florence". Journal of the Canadian Society for Syriac Studies. 13: 29–44. doi:10.31826/9781463235840-003. ISBN 9781463235840.
- Borbone, Pier Giorgio; Farina, Margherita (2014). "New Documents concerning Patriarch Ignatius Na'matallah (Mardin, ca. 1515 – Bracciano, near Rome, 1587) 1. Elias, the Nestorian Bishop". Egitto e Vicino Oriente. 37. Pisa University Press: 179–189.
- Borbone, Pier Giorgio (2017). "From Tur 'Abdin to Rome: the Syro-Orthodox presence in Sixteenth-Century Rome". In Herman Teule; Elif Keser-Kayaalp; Kutlu Akalin; Nesim Dorum; M. Sait Toprak (eds.). Syriac in its Multi-cultural Context: First International Syriac Studies Symposium. Peeters. pp. 279–289.
- Cassar, Carmel (2011). "Malta and the study of Arabic in the sixteenth to the nineteenth centuries" (PDF). Turkish Historical Review. 2 (2). Brill: 125–154. doi:10.1163/187754611X603083.
- Clines, Robert John (2020). "Pope as Arbiter: The Place of Early Modern Rome in the Pan-Mediterranean Ecumenical Visions of Eastern Rite Christians". In Matthew Coneys Wainwright; Emily Michelson (eds.). A Companion to Religious Minorities in Early Modern Rome. Brill. pp. 55–88.
- Cox, Virginia (2018). "An Unknown Early Modern New World Epic: Girolamo Vecchietti's Delle prodezze di Ferrante Cortese (1587-88)". Renaissance Quarterly. 71 (4). Renaissance Society of America: 1351–1390. doi:10.1086/700860. S2CID 165924836.
- Farina, Margherita (2018). "Giovanni Battista Raimondi's Travel in the Middle East: A Case of Sixteenth Century Portuguese-Italian Interference". Oriente Moderno. 98. Istituto per l’Oriente: 52–72. doi:10.1163/22138617-12340109. S2CID 166031854.
- Frazee, Charles A. (1983). Catholics and Sultans: The Church and the Ottoman Empire 1453-1923. Cambridge University Press.
- Grafton, Anthony (1991). Defenders of the Text: The Traditions of Scholarship in an Age of Science, 1450-1800. Harvard University Press.
- Halft, Dennis (2016). The Arabic Vulgate in Safavid Persia: Arabic Printing of the Gospels, Catholic Missionaries, and the Rise of Shīʿī Anti-Christian Polemics (PDF). Free University of Berlin.
- Hamilton, Alastair (2006). The Copts and the West, 1439-1822: The European Discovery of the Egyptian Church. Oxford University Press.
- Jones, Robert (2020). Learning Arabic in Renaissance Europe (1505-1624). BRILL.
- Kiraz, George A. (2011). "Niʿmatullāh, Ignatius". In Sebastian P. Brock; Aaron M. Butts; George A. Kiraz; Lucas Van Rompay (eds.). Gorgias Encyclopedic Dictionary of the Syriac Heritage: Electronic Edition. Gorgias Press. p. 308.
- Mazzola, Marianna (2018). "The Textual Tradition of Bar 'Ebroyo's Chronicle: a Preliminary Study". Le Muséon. 131 (1–2): 73–100.
- O'Mahony, Anthony (2010). "Between Rome and Antioch: the Origins and development of the Syrian Catholic Church, 1781-1929". In Nicolas Balutet; Paloma Otaola; Delphine Tempère (eds.). Contrabandista entre mundos fronterizos: hommage au Professeur Hugues Didier. Publibook. pp. 135–153.
- Orsatti, Paola (2015). "Italy viii. PERSIAN MANUSCRIPTS". Encyclopædia Iranica. Vol. 14. pp. 273–277.
- Parker, Lucy (2018). "The Ambiguities of Belief and Belonging: Catholicism and the Church of the East in the Sixteenth Century". English Historical Review. 133 (565). Oxford University Press: 1420–1445. doi:10.1093/ehr/cey334.
- Pritula, Anton (2019). "ʿAbdīšōʿ of Gāzartā, Patriarch of the Chaldean Church as a Scribe". Scrinium. 15. Brill: 297–320. doi:10.1163/18177565-00151P19.
- Saliba, George (2007). Islamic Science and the Making of the European Renaissance. MIT Press.
- Saliba, George (2008). "Embedding Scientific Ideas as a Mode of Science Transmission". In Emilia Calvo; Mercè Comes; Roser Puig; Mònica Rius (eds.). A Shared Legacy: Islamic Science East and West. Routledge. pp. 193–214.
- Salvadore, Matteo (2017). "African Cosmopolitanism in the Early Modern Mediterranean: The Diasporic Life of Yohannes, the Ethiopian Pilgrim Who Became a Counter-Reformation Bishop". Journal of African History. 58 (1). Cambridge University Press: 61–83. doi:10.1017/S002185371600058X. S2CID 164524442.
- Takahashi, Hidemi (2011a). "Also via Istanbul to New Haven- Mss. Yale Syriac 7-12". In Felicitas Opwis; David Reisman (eds.). Islamic Philosophy, Science, Culture, and Religion: Studies in Honour of Dimitri Gutas. Brill. pp. 157–179.
- Takahashi, Hidemi (2011b). "The Mathematical Sciences in Syriac: From Sergius of Resh-'Aina and Severus Sebokht to Barhebraeus and Patriarch Ni'matallah". Annals of Science. 68 (4). Taylor & Francis: 477–491. doi:10.1080/00033790.2011.588498. S2CID 143806266.
- Toomer, Gerald J. (1990). Apollonius: Conics Books V to VII: The Arabic Translation of the Lost Greek Original in the Version of the Banū Mūsā. Vol. I: Introduction, Text, and Translation. Springer-Verlag.
- Toomer, Gerald J. (1996). Eastern Wisedome and Learning: The Study of Arabic in Seventeenth-century England. Clarendon Press.
- Van Rompay, Lucas (2011). "Mushe of Mardin". In Sebastian P. Brock; Aaron M. Butts; George A. Kiraz; Lucas Van Rompay (eds.). Gorgias Encyclopedic Dictionary of the Syriac Heritage: Electronic Edition. Gorgias Press. pp. 300–301.
- Wilkinson, Robert J. (2012). "Syriac Studies in Rome in the Second Half of the Sixteenth Century". Journal for Late Antique Religion and Culture. 6. Cardiff University: 55–74. doi:10.18573/j.2012.10312.
- Wilmshurst, David (2019). "West Syrian patriarchs and maphrians". In Daniel King (ed.). The Syriac World. Routledge. pp. 806–813.
- Ziggelaar, August (1983). "The Papal Bull of 1582 Promulgating a Reform of the Calendar". In George V. Coyne; Michael A. Hoskin; Olaf Pedersen (eds.). Gregorian Reform of the Calendar : Proceedings of the Vatican Conference to Commemorate Its 400th Anniversary. Pontifical Academy of Sciences. pp. 201–239.

Preceded by Basil Elias	Syriac Orthodox Maphrian of the East; 1555–1557	Succeeded by Basil ʿAbd al-Ghani I al-Mansuri
Preceded by Ignatius Abdullah I	Syriac Orthodox Patriarch of Antioch; 1557–1576	Succeeded by Ignatius David II Shah
