= Madenköy, Şirvan =

Village in Siirt Province, Turkey

Madenköy
- Village
- Location within Turkey
- Coordinates: 38.091°N 42.153°E
- Country: Turkey
- Province: Siirt
- District: Şirvan
- Population (2021): 778
- Time zone: UTC+3 (TRT)

Madenköy (Arabic: المعدن; Kurdish: Madan; Syriac: ܡܥܕܢ, romanized: Maʿdan) (Note: Alternatively transliterated as Māʿdan or Maden. Also known as al-Ma‛dan.) is a village in the Şirvan District of Siirt Province in Turkey. The village is populated by Kurds of the Sturkiyan tribe and had a population of 778 in 2021.

== History ==
Maʿdan (today called Madenköy) was historically inhabited by Syriac Orthodox Christians. The Maphrian Basilius Barsoum II (r. 1422–1454) was from Maʿdan. Patriarch Ignatius David I (r. 1519–1521) was from Ma‘dan. The monk Ibrahim of Ma’dan is attested at the Monastery of Mar Malke in 1560. There was a community of adherents of the Church of the East. It is alternatively named as an Armenian village. In the Syriac Orthodox patriarchal register of dues of 1870, it was recorded that the village had 29 households, who paid 290 dues, and it had one priest. There was a church of Yūldaṯ Alohō and a monastery of Morī Gewargīs.

In a letter from Priest Ibrahim to Patriarch Ignatius Abdul Masih II, it is recorded that the village was attacked by about 100 men of the Danabkta kochers led by two sons of the chief of the tribe, Mijdad Agha, on 15 October 1895, amidst the Hamidian massacres, resulting in the death of the priest, 10 men, and 4 women. Alternatively, Demli Kurds plundered and burned the village and killed 20 villagers, according to James Henry Monahan, the British Vice-Consul of Bitlis. By 1898, there were 20 Syriac Orthodox families, of whom 10 migrated to Bitlis, whilst those who remained stayed in houses that had been rebuilt by the authorities.

== Ecclesiastical history ==
The Syriac Orthodox diocese of Maʿdan was apparently established in 1329. (Note: Wilmshurst places the establishment of the diocese in the fifteenth century.) Dionysius Malke I of the Zuqaqi family of Arbo was metropolitan of Maʿdan in 1450 and died in 1465. Dionysius Malke II was metropolitan of Maʿdan in 1494. Dionysius Dawud (David) was ordained as metropolitan of Ma’dan by Patriarch Ignatius Noah of Lebanon in 1496 alongside Philoxenus Jacob, who was ordained as metropolitan of Amid. Dionysius Dawud, metropolitan of Maʿdan (1583–1601), was from the village of Klaybin and the Monastery of Mar Malke, and was ordained by Patriarch Ignatius David II Shah. (Note: According to Fiey, Dionysius David of Klibin is attested between 1568 and 1601. In 1579/1580, the diocese consisted of "Meadin, the region of the Xeruyé (Shirwan), Hizzi, Hayzam, Hilat, and Argix".) Dioscorus Saliba was transferred from the diocese of Jazirat ibn ‘Umar to Ma’dan in 1698, at which time the seat was at the Monastery of Mar Gurgis, and likely died in 1714.

Shim’un (Simon), metropolitan of Ma’dan, proclaimed himself as patriarch of Antioch in c. 1699 in opposition to Patriarch Ignatius George II and appointed his nephew Yusuf as metropolitan of Ma’dan in his stead. However, Yusuf repented and was ordained as metropolitan of Ma’dan by Ignatius George II with the name Dionysius in 1714 and administered the diocese until his death in 1746 or 1749. A bishop named George is mentioned in 1730. At certain points in the 18th and 19th centuries, the diocese was united with the diocese of Bitlis. Cyril Faraj Allah was ordained as metropolitan of Ma’dan by Patriarch Ignatius Shukrallah II in 1727 and was transferred to the diocese of Bitlis in 1732. (Note: Barsoum places Cyril Faraj Allah's appointment as metropolitan of Ma’dan in 1732 and his transfer to the diocese of Bitlis in 1740, in which year Fiey places his transfer to the diocese of Gargar.)

Bulus (Paul), son of ‘Abd al-Ahad of Ma’dan, was ordained as metropolitan of Ma’dan by Patriarch Ignatius Shukrallah II in 1745 and died in 1769. Gregorius Behnam was ordained as metropolitan of Ma’dan by Patriarch Ignatius George III at the church of Amid in 1761, by which time the diocese's seat was at the Monastery of Mar Quryaqos, and either died in 1769 or shortly before the ordination of his successor Dionysius Shim’un in 1779. Dionysius Jonas of Ma’dan (1782/1818) restored the diocese's monastery. Cyril Gabriel Tsholtshi was bishop of Bitlis and al-Ma’dan until his resignation in 1838/1847. Dionysius Dawud was metropolitan of Ma’dan and then of Edessa (1840–1866). Dionysius Behnam Kayyal of Mosul, metropolitan of Ma’dan (1852–1879), died in 1879 and was buried at the Mor Hananyo Monastery. The bishop Julius ʿAbd al-Masih Basmahdji sometimes stayed at Ma’dan between 1860 and 1892.

== Bibliography ==
- Al-Jeloo, Nicholas (2019). "Who were the Assyrians of Bitlis?". In Mehmet İnbaşı; Mehmet Demirtaş (eds.). Tarihî ve Kültürel Yönleriyle Bitlis. Vol. II. Bitlis Eren Üniversitesi Yayınları. pp. 363–390.
- Barsoum, Aphrem (2008a). History of the Za'faran Monastery. Translated by Matti Moosa. Gorgias Press.
- Barsoum, Aphrem (2008b). The History of Tur Abdin. Translated by Matti Moosa. Gorgias Press.
- Barsoum, Aphrem (2009a). History of the Syriac Dioceses. Vol. 1. Translated by Matti Moosa. Gorgias Press.
- Barsoum, Aphrem (2009b). The Collected Historical Essays of Aphram I Barsoum. Vol. 1. Translated by Matti Moosa. Gorgias Press.
- Bcheiry, Iskandar (2009). The Syriac Orthodox Patriarchal Register of Dues of 1870: An Unpublished Historical Document from the Late Ottoman Period. Gorgias Press.
- Bcheiry, Iskandar (2010). A List of Syriac Orthodox Ecclesiastic Ordinations from the Sixteenth and Seventeenth Century: The Syriac Manuscript of Hunt 444 (Syr 68 in Bodleian Library, Oxford). Gorgias Press.
- Demir Görür, Emel (2020). "İngiliz Konsolos James Henry Monahan'ın Raporlarında Bitlis Vilayeti (1896-1898)". Akademik Bakış (in Turkish). 13 (26): 244–266. doi:10.19060/gav.750472. Archived from the original on 27 November 2020.
- Dinno, Khalid S. (2017). The Syrian Orthodox Christians in the Late Ottoman Period and Beyond: Crisis then Revival. Gorgias Press.
- Fiey, Jean Maurice (1993). Pour un Oriens Christianus Novus: Répertoire des diocèses syriaques orientaux et occidentaux (in French).
- Verheij, Jelle (2017). ""The year of the firman:" The 1895 massacres in Hizan and Şirvan (Bitlis vilayet)". Études arméniennes contemporaines. 10 (10): 125–159.
- Wilmshurst, David (2000). The Ecclesiastical Organisation of the Church of the East, 1318–1913 (PDF). Peeters Publishers.
