= Ignatius Jacob I =

96th Patriarch of Syriac Orthodox Church of Antioch (1510–1517)

- Syriac Orthodox Patriarch of Antioch and All the East
- Church: Syriac Orthodox Church
- See: Antioch
- Installed: 1510/1512
- Term ended: 1517/1519
- Predecessor: Ignatius Yeshu I
- Successor: Ignatius David I

Personal details
- Born: al-Aḥmadiyya
- Died: 1517/1519

Ignatius Jacob I (Syriac: ܦܛܪܝܪܟܐ ܝܥܩܘܒ ܩܕܡܝܐ, Arabic: يعقوب الاول بطريرك انطاكية; d. 1517/1519), also known as Jacob al-Khuri or Jacob of al-Nabk, was the Patriarch of Antioch and head of the Syriac Orthodox Church from 1510/1512 until his death in 1517/1519.

== Biography ==
Jacob was born at al-Aḥmadiyya, a village near Ṣawro in Tur Abdin, and was the son of the rahib (monk) Maqdisi Hasan, son of the rahib 'Abd Allah of the Muzawwiq family. Aphram Barsoum suggests that Jacob's father and grandfather had likely been novice monks without ordination that had laicised, but retained the designation of monk, for which Jacob was known as "al-Khuri". He became a monk and priest at the monastery of Saint Moses the Abyssinian, near Al-Nabek in Syria, and studied under the malphono (theological doctor) monk-priest Moses, son of 'Ubayd of Sadad. Here, he became proficient in Syriac and calligraphy, and befriended the monk David of Homs. For this, he gained the sobriquet "Nabki" or "of Al-Nabk", which led later writers to erroneously claim he was from Syria, whilst others gave Damascus as his place of birth.

Jacob subsequently travelled to the monastery of Saint Ananias, and from there to the monastery of Saint Abay, near Qeleth, in 1480. He also visited the monastery of the Syrians in Egypt in 1482. He is noted to have moved to the monastery of Saint Balai in Tur Abdin by 1487 and later resided at the monastery of Saint Ananias in 1489. Joseph al-Gurji, future archbishop of Jerusalem, studied under Jacob at some point. In 1496, he was ordained as archbishop of Amida by Patriarch Ignatius Noah of Lebanon, upon which he assumed the name Philoxenus, alongside Dionysius David, who was appointed as archbishop of Ma‘dan. The deacon Nur al-Din, son of Shallila, composed an ode in praise of Jacob's conduct in this office, a copy of which was later found by Aphrem Barsoum.

After the death of the patriarch Ignatius Noah in 1509, a synod was convened at the monastery of Saint Ananias in the same year and Severus Yeshu, archbishop of the monastery of Saint Abay, was elected as his successor as patriarch of Antioch. However, for reasons unknown, Jacob was also appointed as patriarch of Antioch in 1510 or 1512, assuming the name Ignatius, whilst Yeshu was still patriarch. (Note: Jacob's ascension is placed either in 1510, or 1512.) In addition, the bishops of Syria ordained Athanasius bar Subay of Al-Nabek as patriarch in 1511 in opposition to Yeshu and Jacob. According to David Wilmshurst, Jacob and Yeshu ruled concurrent with one another until 1519, whilst Aphrem Barsoum notes that Athanasius bar Subay simultaneously claimed the patriarchal office until his death likely at some point between 1514 and 1518.

In a homologia (confession) found at Edessa, it is recorded that Jacob ordained deacon Abd Allah for the church of Saint Mary at Amida and deacon Ghazal for the churches of Saint Ahudemmeh and Saint Thomas at Mosul on 6 August 1512. He served as patriarch of Antioch until his death in 1517 or 1519. (Note: Jacob's death is placed either in 1517, or 1519.)

== Works ==
A number of works written by Jacob on various subjects have survived, including a Beth Gazo (Za'faran MS. 124), written in 1488. Several lines of his poetry on the subject of repentance are attested in a grammar book at Midyat, as well as his comments on some festivals are contained in a homologia (Paris Library MS. 112). He also wrote a historical tract including the chronicles of David of Homs, that were later found at the monastery of the Cross. Jacob is further credited with a manuscript on the canons of baptism, marriage, and repentance, found at the library at Edessa.

== Bibliography ==
- Barsoum, Aphrem (2003). The Scattered Pearls: A History of Syriac Literature and Sciences. Translated by Matti Moosa (2nd ed.). Gorgias Press.
- Barsoum, Aphrem (2008). History of the Za'faran Monastery. Translated by Matti Moosa. Gorgias Press.
- Barsoum, Aphrem (2009). The Collected Historical Essays of Aphram I Barsoum. Vol. 1. Translated by Matti Moosa. Gorgias Press. Archived from the original on 14 October 2018.
- Burleson, Samuel; Van Rompay, Lucas (2011). "List of Patriarchs: II. The Syriac Orthodox Church and its Uniate continuations". In Sebastian P. Brock; Aaron M. Butts; George A. Kiraz; Lucas Van Rompay (eds.). Gorgias Encyclopedic Dictionary of the Syriac Heritage: Electronic Edition. Gorgias Press.
- Wilmshurst, David (2019). "West Syrian patriarchs and maphrians". In Daniel King (ed.). The Syriac World. Routledge. pp. 806–813.

Preceded by Ignatius Yeshu I	Syriac Orthodox Patriarch of Antioch; 1510/1512–1517/1519	Succeeded by Ignatius David I
