= Patriarch John XIII =

Patriarch John XIII may refer to:

- John XIII of Constantinople, Ecumenical Patriarch in 1315–1320
- Ignatius John XIII, Syriac Orthodox Patriarch of Antioch in 1483–1493
- Pope John XIII of Alexandria, Pope of Alexandria & Patriarch of the See of St. Mark in 1483–1524
