= Andreas Masius =

Catholic priest and humanist (1514–1573)

Andreas Masius (or Maes) (30 November 1514 – 7 April 1573) was a Catholic priest, humanist and one of the first European syriacists.

== Biography ==
Masius was born in Lennik, Flemish Brabant.

Following his education, and after a short period of training at Leuven, studying Latin under Conrad Goclenius, Masius worked as secretary for the bishop of Constance, Johan Weze († 13 November 1548). Later, among other things, he became the diplomatic representative in Rome for the Abbot Gerwig Blarer (1495–1567) of Weingarten. On behalf of Wilhelm, Duke of Jülich-Cleves-Berg in 1555, he requested permission from the Pope for the establishment of a university at Duisburg.

Masius studied Hebrew in Leuven, Arabic in Rome with Guillaume Postel and in 1553 Syriac with Moses of Mardin, a priest of the Patriarchate of Antioch in Syria.

Masius was one of the voices that argued all his life against the destruction of the Talmud and other Hebrew literature in the aftermath of the Bragadin-Giustiniani dispute. According to him, Christian studies required a knowledge of Hebrew and rabbinic literature and that their destruction would be a great damage to Christianity, reflecting the growing counterside to the argument that Christians should not be allowed to read them. In this regard, he wrote on 24 December 1553 a letter to cardinal Sebastiano Antonio Pighini, arguing that the understanding of the Talmud would help in the conversion of Jews, and another one to the Venetian senate in 1554, pleading them to refrain from burning the Talmud. Pighini is likely to have shown the letter to pope Julius III who, impressed by the letter, might have compromised on the burning of books and while reaffirming the ban on the Talmud approved the use of other rabbinic works. Pius V, a successor of Julius III, was however one of the harshest opponents of rabbinic literature and therefore included Masius' name on the list of dangerous authors and placed his commentary on Joshua on the Index.

After leaving the priesthood and marrying, in 1559, he settled in Zevenaar and in the last years of his life published several works. Masius died in Zevenaar in 1573.

== Translations and published works ==
Masius translated two creedal documents from Syriac for Yohannan Sulaqa, the (anti-)patriarch-elect of the Church of the East. In 1554, probably in Germany, he made a Latin translation of the Syriac 'Basilius-Anaphora' for Julius von Pflug († 3 September 1564), the last Catholic bishop of Naumburg-Zeitz. These were printed together with Masius' translation of the treatise De Paradiso of Moses Bar-Kepha.

De Paradiso Commentarivs : Scriptvs Ante Annos Prope Septingentos / à Mose Bar-Cepha Syro; ... Adiecta Est Etiam Divi Basilii Caesariensis Episcopi leiturgia siue anaphora ex vetustissimo codice Syrica lingua scripto. Praetera professiones fidei duæ, altera Mosis Mardeni Iacobitæ ... altera Sulaçe siue Siud Nestoriani ... Omnia ex Syrica lingua nuper tralata per Andream Masivm ... Antverpiæ, Ex Officina Christophori Plantini, 1569.

In 1571 Masius published his Grammatica linguae syricae as well as the dictionary Syrorum Peculium. Hoc est, vocabula apud Syros scriptores passim vsurpata, at the Plantin press in Antwerp. In 1574 it was published his work Josuae Imperatoris historia illustrata atque explicata, that included some Hexaplaric readings.

== Literature ==
- Albert van Roey: Les études syriaques d'Andreas Masius. In: Orientalia Lovaniensia Periodica 9 (1978), 141–158.
- M. Lossen, Briefe von Andreas Masius und seinen Freunden (1538)
- Stow, Kenneth R. (1972). "The Burning of the Talmud in 1553, in the Light of Sixteenth Century Catholic Attitudes Toward the Talmud". Bibliothèque d'Humanisme et Renaissance. 34 (3): 435–459. ISSN 0006-1999.
- J. W. Wesselius, The Syriac Correspondence of Andreas Masius: A Preliminary Report
