= Ignatius Noah of Lebanon =

Patriarch of Syriac Orthodox Church

- Syriac Orthodox Patriarch of Antioch and All the East
- Church: Syriac Orthodox Church
- See: Antioch
- Installed: 1493/1494
- Term ended: 1509
- Predecessor: Ignatius John XIV
- Successor: Ignatius Yeshu I

Personal details
- Born: 1451 Baqufa, Mamluk Sultanate
- Died: 28 July 1509 Homs, Mamluk Sultanate

Ignatius Noah of Lebanon (Syriac: ܦܛܪܝܪܟܐ ܢܘܚ ܠܒܢܢܝܐ, Arabic: البطريرك نوح اللبناني), also known as Nūḥ Pūnīqoyo or Nūḥ al-Bqūfānī, was the Patriarch of Antioch and head of the Syriac Orthodox Church from 1493/1494 until his death in 1509.

== Biography ==
Noah was born in 1451 at the village of Baqufa on Mount Lebanon to a Maronite family, but later converted and joined the Syriac Orthodox Church. He entered the monastery of Saint Moses the Abyssinian, near Al-Nabek in Syria, and studied religion and Syriac under the monk-priest Thomas of Homs. Noah became a priest and was later ordained as archbishop of Homs in 1480, upon which he assumed the name Cyril. It is noted by the anonymous continuator of the Ecclesiastical History of Bar Hebraeus that Noah was proficient in Arabic and Syriac.

Several years prior to 1487, Noah travelled from Jerusalem to Fraydiss, near Ehden in Bsharri District on Mount Lebanon, to preach amongst the Maronites and provide teaching. Here, he gained a number of converts who he then brought before Dioscorus, archbishop of Jerusalem, and they were ordained as secular and regular clergymen. The Maronite historian and patriarch Istifan al-Duwayhi in Tarikh Al Azminah names Noah as the first to undertake sustained Syriac Orthodox missionary work to the Maronites. Whilst the Maronite historian Gabriel ibn al-Qilai does not mention Noah, he does attest to his disciples and their continued missionary work. However, in 1488, the Syriac Orthodox missionaries and converts were expelled from the Bsharri District by Maronites from Ehden, according to al-Duwayhi.

In 1489 or 1490, Noah was consecrated as Maphrian of the East and assumed the name Basil. (Note: Noah's ascension as maphrian is placed either in 1489, or 1490.) It is recorded in MS. Vatican sir. 97 that he delivered a sermon at Mosul in the spring of 1492 (AG 1803), in which he condemned Nestorians for their opposition to the title of Theotokos (Syriac: yāldath ʾallāhā, "God-bearer") for Mary, mother of Jesus, and divergence in celebration of the Feast of the Annunciation. After the death of the patriarch Ignatius John XIV in 1493, a synod was convened at the monastery of Saint Ananias, near Mardin in Tur Abdin, and Noah was elected as his successor as patriarch of Antioch, upon which he assumed the name Ignatius. (Note: Noah's ascension as patriarch is placed either in 1493, or 1494.) He subsequently appealed to Qāsim ibn Jahāngīr, Aq Qoyunlu Sultan of Mardin, and the emir of Hasankeyf to be invested as Patriarch of all Sūryoyē to preclude rivals.

Soon after his ascension to the patriarchal office, he became embroiled in a controversy between the bishops of Tur Abdin and Patriarch Masʿūd II of Ṭur ʿAbdin. Masʿūd had incurred the wrath of his suffragan bishops after he had ordained Basil Malki of Midyat as maphrian of Tur Abdin and twelve bishops without dioceses, thereby in violation of canon laws. This included dioceses beyond Masʿūd's jurisdiction and some that already had incumbent bishops, such as the archdiocese of Ma‘dan, to which Masʿūd had ordained the priest Abraham in opposition to the candidate appointed by Noah. In a letter, the Coptic Pope John XIII of Alexandria lent his support to Noah against Masʿūd, but advised conciliation and unity to preserve the integrity of the church.

After his bishops had complained to the authorities at Hasankeyf in 1494, Masʿūd was imprisoned and deposed as patriarch, and they appealed to Noah to pledge allegiance to him. Through the arbitration of Sultan Qāsim ibn Jahāngīr of Mardin, the bishops of Tur Abdin and Noah were reconciled in 1495, and Masʿūd went into exile at a monastery at Kharput. This marked the first instance in which the bishops of Tur Abdin had reconciled with the patriarch of Antioch after the schism that followed the establishment of a separate patriarchate of Tur Abdin in 1364. Noah served as patriarch of Antioch until his death on 28 July 1509 at Homs. As patriarch, Noah consecrated thirteen bishops.

== Works ==
Noah wrote a service book for the order of ordinations in 1506 (Jerusalem MS. 111), of which two copies were transcribed in the sixteenth century (Jerusalem MS. 110 and Jerusalem MS. 113). He also wrote a brief historical tract that was later edited by Giuseppe Simone Assemani (Vatican sir. 97). An anonymous polemical text, entitled Treatise on the faith of the Syrians (Arabic: السريانية االمانة علي م), in which dyophysite Christianity is criticised, is ascribed to Noah. As well as this, he wrote a 92-page anthology that contained a number of homilies (pl. Syriac: memre) on ascetical, theological, and philosophical subjects. This included an ode to Homs and Lebanon and a eulogy to his former tutor Thomas of Homs. A hymn in Arabic dedicated to Mary, mother of Jesus, written by Noah also survives.

== Episcopal succession ==
As patriarch, Noah ordained the following bishops:

- Philoxenus Jacob, archbishop of Amida (1496)
- Dionysius David, archbishop of Ma‘dan (1496)
- John Stephen, bishop of the monastery of Qartmin (1496)

== See also ==
- Ibn Inabah

== Bibliography ==
- Barsoum, Aphrem (2003). The Scattered Pearls: A History of Syriac Literature and Sciences. Translated by Matti Moosa (2nd ed.). Gorgias Press.
- Barsoum, Aphrem (2008a). History of the Za'faran Monastery. Translated by Matti Moosa. Gorgias Press.
- Barsoum, Aphrem (2008b). The History of Tur Abdin. Translated by Matti Moosa. Gorgias Press.
- Barsoum, Aphrem (2009). The Collected Historical Essays of Aphram I Barsoum. Vol. 1. Translated by Matti Moosa. Gorgias Press.
- Carlson, Thomas A. (2018). Christianity in Fifteenth-Century Iraq. Cambridge University Press.
- Kiraz, George A. (2018) [2011]. "Maphrian". In Sebastian P. Brock; Aaron M. Butts; George A. Kiraz; Lucas Van Rompay (eds.). Gorgias Encyclopedic Dictionary of the Syriac Heritage: Electronic Edition. Beth Mardutho [Gorgias Press].
- Salibi, Kamal Suleiman (1959). Maronite Historians of Mediæval Lebanon. Beirut, Lebanon: American University of Beirut. OCLC 2011960.
- Swanson, Mark N. (2010). The Coptic Papacy in Islamic Egypt (641–1517). American University in Cairo Press. ISBN 9789774160936.
- Teule, Herman G. B. (2011). "Nuḥ the Lebanese". In Sebastian P. Brock; Aaron M. Butts; George A. Kiraz; Lucas Van Rompay (eds.). Gorgias Encyclopedic Dictionary of the Syriac Heritage: Electronic Edition. Gorgias Press. pp. 313–314.
- Wilmshurst, David (2019). "West Syrian patriarchs and maphrians". In Daniel King (ed.). The Syriac World. Routledge. pp. 806–813.

Preceded by Basil ʿAziz	Syriac Orthodox Maphrian of the East; 1489/1490–1493/1494	Succeeded by Basil Abraham III
Preceded by Ignatius John XIV	Syriac Orthodox Patriarch of Antioch; 1493/1494–1509	Succeeded by Ignatius Yeshu I
