= Moses bar Kepha =

Syriac Orthodox bishop and scholar

Mār Moses bar Kepha ܡܘܫܐ ܒܪ ܟܐܦܐ
- Bishop
- Native name: ܡܘܫܐ ܒܪ ܟܐܦܐ
- Church: Syriac Orthodox Church
- Diocese: Tagrit
- See: Antioch

Moses bar Kepha or Cephas, also called Mushe bar Kipho (Syriac: ܡܘܫܐ ܒܪ ܟܐܦܐ, romanized: Mōšē bar Kīpā; c. 813 or c. 833 – February 12, 903) was a writer and one of the most celebrated bishops of the Syriac Orthodox Church of the ninth century.

== Life ==
What is known about him comes from an autobiography written by an unknown author bundled with his works. Moses was born in Balad (modern-day Eski Mosul) in c. 813 or c. 833. At the age of 22, he became a monk at the Mar Sargis Monastery in Butman, northeast of Balad. Ten years later, he was ordained as a bishop, where he took the name Severos after Severus of Antioch. His diocese was under the metropolitan of Tikrit, and he served as the bishop of Beth Raman, located north of Tikrit. Various sources also mention the dioceses of Beth Kiyonaye (Beth Bawazig or Waziq), Beth ʿArbaye, and Mosul.

His writings covered a wider range of subjects than any other Syriac author before him, possibly aimed at compiling a summa as a Christian apologia against Muslims. Most of his works were formatted in short chapters, each presented in the style of question-and-answer style.

His works were so great and influential, covering even East Syriac scholars (since he lived in close proximity), that he is called "one of the great scholars of the Syriac Orthodox Church."

== Principal writings ==
- A Commentary on the Old and New Testaments, often quoted by Bar Hebraeus, and most of it still extant in manuscript form;
- a treatise on predestination and free will, preserved in a manuscript in the British Library (Add MS 14731);
- a commentary on Aristotle's Dialectics, mentioned by Bar Hebraeus;
- a commentary on the Hexameron in five books, preserved in the Bibliothèque Nationale de France (Syr. 241), a passage of which is translated into French by François Nau in his Bardésane l'astrologue (Paris, 1899), p. 59;
- a Tractatus de Paradiso, in three parts, dedicated to his friend Ignatius. (The Syriac original of this work was thought lost, but a Latin version of it was published by Andreas Masius (Antwerp, 1569) under the title De Paradiso Commentarius. However a Syriac manuscript has now been discovered at Yale)
- A treatise on the soul, in forty chapters, with a supplementary essay on the utility of offering prayers and sacrifices for the dead. (This treatise is preserved in the Vatican Library; a German translation of it is given by O. Braun in his Moses Bar-Kepha und sein Buch von der Seele (Freiburg, 1891).)
- A Tractatus de sectis, or, Liber disputationum adversus haereses (see Assemani, B.O. II, 57);
- a treatise on the Sacraments;
- a commentary on the Liturgy;
- an ecclesiastical history.

His other works comprise discourses, homilies, and a commentary on the writings of St Gregory of Nazianzus.

== Sources ==
- Coakley, James F. (2011). "Mushe bar Kipho (d. 903) [Syr. Orth.]". In Brock, Sebastian P.; Butts, Aaron Michael; Kiraz, George A.; Rompay, Lucas Van (eds.). Gorgias Encyclopedic Dictionary of the Syriac Heritage. Gorgias Press, LLC. p. 300. ISBN 9781593337148.
