= Ignatius David II Shah =

100th Patriarch of the Syriac Orthodox Church of Antioch (1576–1591)

Ignatuis David II Shah
- Syriac Orthodox Patriarch of Antioch and All the East
- Church: Syriac Orthodox Church
- See: Antioch
- Installed: 1576
- Term ended: 1591
- Predecessor: Ignatius Ni'matallah
- Successor: Ignatius Pilate

Personal details
- Born: Mardin, Ottoman Empire
- Died: 1591 Amid
- Residence: Amid

Ignatius David II Shah (Syriac ܕܘܕ ܫܗ) was the Patriarch of Antioch and head of the Syriac Orthodox Church from 1576 until his death in 1591.

== Biography ==
Ignatius David II Shah is the third member of the family of Sa’ad Al-Din to became a patriarch after his great uncle Ignatius John XIV bar Shay Allah (1483-1493) and his brother Ignatius Ni'matallah (1557-1576). He also had 4 other brothers, Timothy Thomas, Bishop of Mardin, Mina, bishop of Mor Abay monastery in Tur-Abdin, Costantine, and Basha. He was first ordained as a Maphrian of the East for the Syriac Orthodox Church but he became the Syriac Orthodox Patriarch when his brother Ignatius Niʿmatallah resigned his position as a patriarch and travelled to Rome in 1576 His family is originally from Bartella, near Mosul, but moved to Mardin in the 13th or 14th century and there were 4 patriarchs and 3 metropolitans and bishops from this family. Ignatius David II Shah built and renovated many church and monasteries during his time as a Patriarch. He built churches in Amid, Qatrabil, Alqadyia village, Medras, Garuheya, Masquq, Kliben, Monastery of Mor Abay, Mor Hananyo, Monastery of Mor Abhay in Gargar and gifted all these churches valuables like crosses, bibles, and rugs and he worked hard to activate his community. In 1579 he presided over a Synod meeting in a monastery near Hatakh in Tur-Abdin and one of the decisions from that Synod was no marriage was allowed between cousins up to the 5th degree.

== Contacts with Rome ==
As we have two different sources for Ignatius David II Shah contacts with Rome. One sources is the Syriac orthodox source and the second source are the writings of the Roman Catholic church sources who were in contact with the former Patriarch Ignatius Ni'matallah when he was living in Rome. The only thing that both sources agree on is that the papal envoy, Leonardo Abel, who travelled to Tur Abdin hoping to meet the Patriarch and convince him to declare his union with Rome and carrying with him a letter from his brother, the former Patriarch Ignatius Niʿmatallah, and carrying a pallium with him. When Abel arrived to Dyarbaker, he couldn’t meet the Patriarch but met with a representative of the Patriarch by the name of Rabban Abdunnur at the Monastery of Mor Abhai in Gargar. There was a conversation between the two parties but the conversation didn’t achieve any success. Even the reason for the meeting failure differs between the two sources. The Syriac Orthodox source states that the Patriarch was under the Ottoman rulers pressure not to meet with the papal envoy and the representative of the Patriarch rejected the Council of Chalcedon resolutions and were hesitant to accept the new Gregorian calendar. The Roman Catholic sources states that the Patriarch was under the pressure of the community not to meet with the envoy

== Episcopal succession ==
During Ignatius David II Shah time as a Maphrian and Patriarch, he ordained a Maphrian and 18 metropolitans. In total, he ordained 1153 priest, monks, deacons and nuns.

1. Basil Pilate (1575–1591), Maphrian of the East
2. Mina (his brother) (1575), Bishop of Monastery of Mor Abay
3. La'azar. Bishop of Miyafarqit
4. Severus Malke (1582–1599), Bishop of the Monastery of Mor Malke
5. Shemoun
6. Aziz, bishop for the monastery of Mor Ibrahim in Midyat
7. Habib, bishop of the monastery of Mor Ya'qub in Kafr Shma'
8. Elias, bishop of the monastery of al-Salib,
9. Daoud, bishop of monastery of Mor Gewargis in al-Ma’adan,
10. Aphrem for al-Sur
11. Hananiyya, metropolitan of Gargar
12. Wanes for Kharput,
13. Issa, bishop of the monastery of Mor Yulyana
14. Yuhanna for Tripoli
15. Gewargis, bishop of Hardin
16. Gregorius Behnam (1590–1614), Metropolitan of Jerusalem
17. Yeshu, bishop of Zargil
18. Yeshu, Metropolitan for the monastery of Mor Abay
19. Abduallah, bishop of Marde

== Death ==
Ignatius David II Shah died in 1591 and was buried at St. Thomas church in the village of Qatribil near Amid

Preceded by Basil ʿAbd al-Ghani I al-Mansuri	Syriac Orthodox Maphrian of the East; 1575 - 1576	Succeeded by Basil Pilate
Preceded by Ignatius Ni'matallah	Syriac Orthodox Patriarch of Antioch; 1576 - 1591	Succeeded by Ignatius Pilate
