= St. Stephen of the Abyssinians =

- Santo Stefano degli Abissini
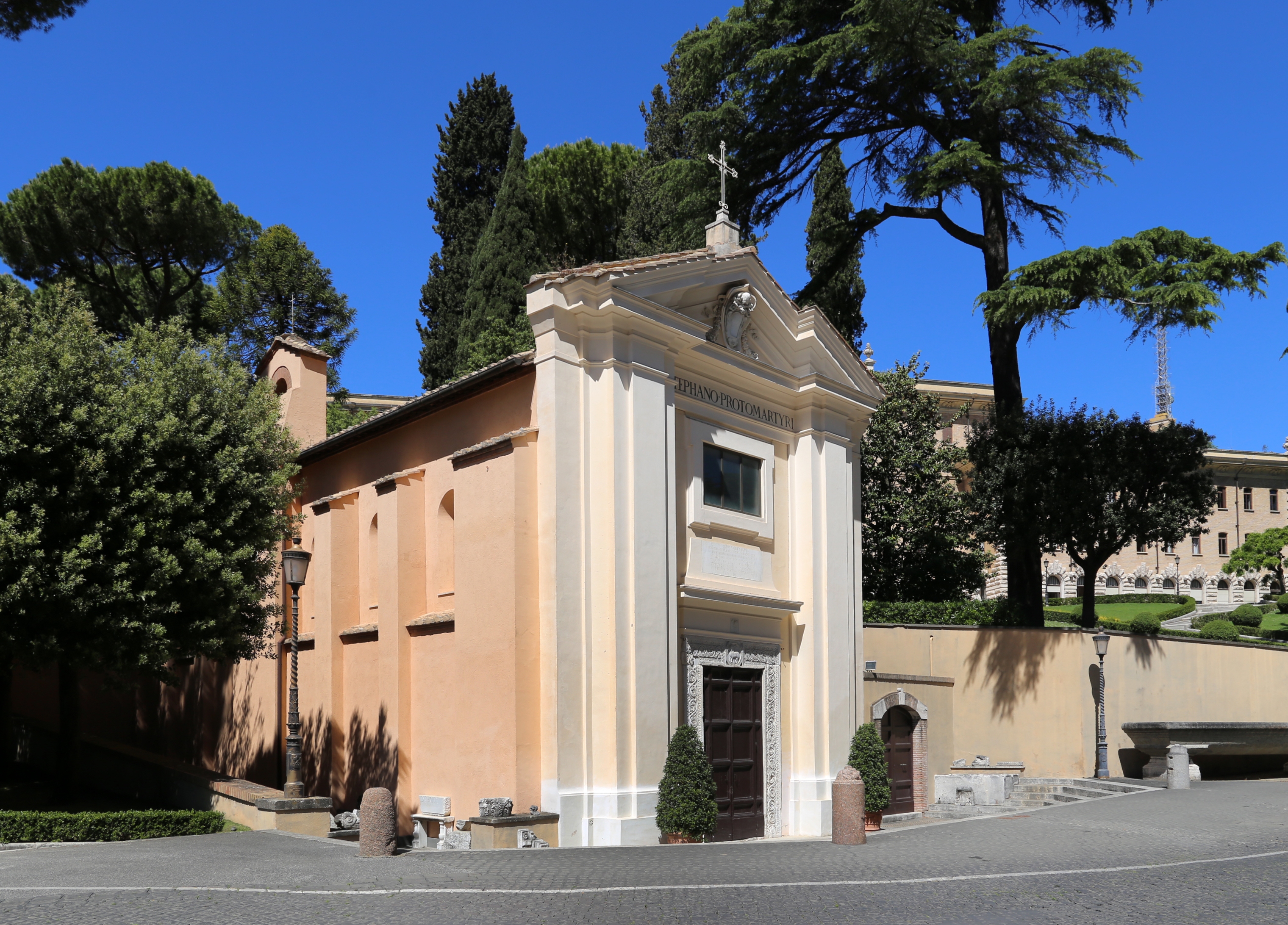
- Santo Stefano degli Abissini
- Click on the map for a fullscreen view
- 41°54′06.47″N 012°27′06.74″E
- Location: Vatican City, Rome, Italy
- Denomination: Eastern Catholic (Ethiopian Catholic Church)
- Tradition: Alexandrian (Coptic) Rite

History
- Status: national church of Ethiopia

Architecture
- Architectural type: Chapel
- Groundbreaking: 5th century or 8th century
- Completed: 9th century

Specifications
- Length: 35 metres (115 ft)
- Width: 20 metres (66 ft)

St. Stephen of the Abyssinians (Italian: Santo Stefano degli Abissini) is an Ethiopian Catholic chapel located in Vatican City. The church dedicated to Stephen the Protomartyr is the national church of Ethiopia. The liturgy is celebrated according to the Alexandrian rite of the Ethiopian Catholic Church. It is one of the only standing structures in the Vatican to survive the destruction of Old St. Peter's Basilica (c.1505), and thus it is the oldest surviving church (in terms of architectural history) in Vatican City.

== History ==
The church was, by tradition, built by Pope Leo I (ca. 400–461), and named Santo Stefano Maggiore.

The biography of Pope Hadrian I, 772-795, names the site as Latin: monasterium S. Stephani cata Barbara patricia situm ad S. Petrum apostolum 'monastery of Saint Stephen associated with the noblewoman Barbara located next to [the church of] Saint Peter the apostle.' The last location mentioned is the Old Saint Peter's Basilica. Other names through history attested in papal documents include "Monastery of Saint Stephen...which is called 'associated with the noblewoman Galla', "oratory of Saint Stephen by Saint Peter['s Basilica] which is called 'The Greater'", and "Saint Stephen the Greater next to Saint Peter, of the Indians." The church had been part of a monastery which was already in existence at the time of the constitutive synod called by Pope Gregory III in 732.

Situated behind Saint Peter's Basilica, Santo Stefano had long been associated with the Ethiopian diaspora. To Italians, it was known as Santo Stefano dei Mori (Moors), degli Indiani (Indians), and degli Abissini. To Ethiopians, it was Däbrä Qeddus Esṭifanos (Amharic: ደብረ ቅዱስ እስጢፋኖስ), 'Monastery of Saint Stephen'.

In 1479, Pope Sixtus IV restored the church and assigned it to the Coptic Catholic monks in the city. It was at this time that the name was changed to reflect that it was served by Ethiopians (Abyssinians).

By the 1530s, it was the most famous community of free Africans in Europe and Leo Africanus referred to it in his Descrittione dell'Africa (1550), describing "certain religious who are friars and have their faces branded; they can be seen throughout Europe but especially in Rome." The most notable Abyssinian monk at St. Stephens was Abba Täsfa Ṣeyon, also known as Pietro Abissino, a monk of Shewan origin who had served in the royal court of Dawit II. "The peak of Santo Stefano's intellectual influence was the mid-16th century, for it was in this period that Täsfa Ṣǝyon, who'd arrived in Rome by 1536 and died there in 1552, tirelessly disseminated knowledge of Ethiopian language and culture."

It was altered under Pope Clement XI (1700–1721), and again in 1928.

In 2006, the church was the venue for the wedding of Lord Nicholas Windsor, godson of the future Charles III, and Paola Doimi de Lupis Frankopan; it was the first Catholic wedding ceremony in the British royal family since the 16th century.

== Exterior ==
The façade is in the style of the early 18th century. The 12th century doorway, decorated with the Lamb and the Cross, has been preserved.

== Interior ==
The church has a single nave with ancient columns along the sides. The most important work of art is a fresco of the Madonna with Child in the Roman style from the 15th century.

== Liturgy ==
The Feast of St. Stephen is celebrated on 26 December.

== See also ==
- Index of Vatican City-related articles
