= Teseo Ambrogio degli Albonesi =

Italian humanist (1469-1540)

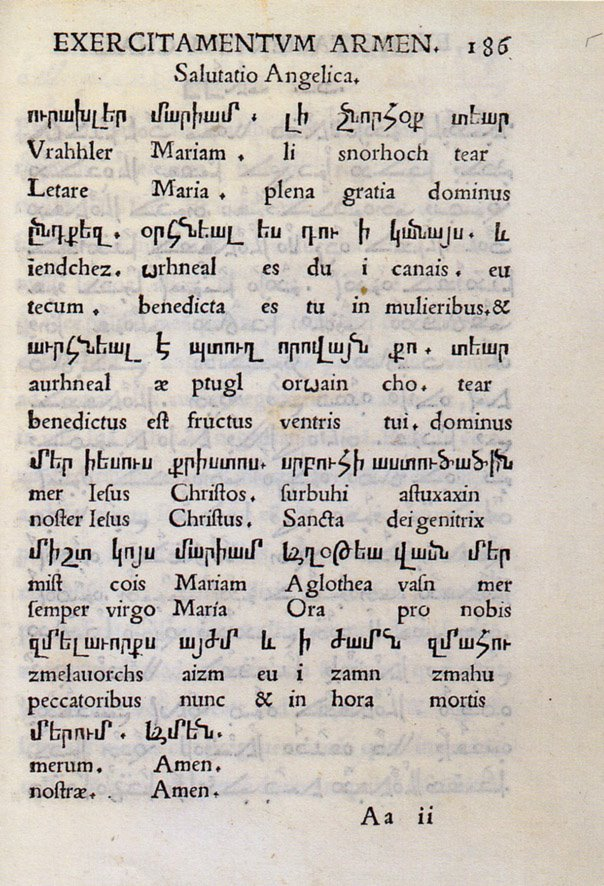
Part of the Armenian text of the Ave Maria (p. 186 of the Introductio).

Teseo Ambrogio degli Albonesi (Theseus Ambrosius, 1469–1540) was an Italian humanist. During the Fifth Council of the Lateran, Teseo was tasked by Cardinal Bernardino López de Carvajal to give religious instruction to a Syrian priest in Latin and liturgy and became an expert in the Syriac language himself. He was a proponent of Christian Kabbalah and an early student of Semitic languages. His Introductio ad Chaldaicam linguam, Syriacam, atque Armenicam, et decem alias linguas (Pavia 1539) was one of the earliest Western studies of Syriac and Armenian. The bulk of the work consists of an Introduction to Chaldean, Syriac and Armenian (foll. 9–192). To this is added an Appendix which includes the presentation of alphabets (foll. 193–213), including brief references to Coptic (called "Jacobite") and Ethiopic (misleadingly called "Indian") and comments on the ancestry of European languages, especially languages of Italy, with a discussion of Etruscan.

== Works ==
- Introductio ad Chaldaicam linguam, Syriacam, atque Armenicam, et decem alias linguas, Pavia (1539); archive.org. Google Books.

== Sources ==
- Fiano, Emanuel A., "Albonesi, Teseo Ambrogio degli" in Gorgias Encyclopedic Dictionary of the Syriac Heritage: Electronic Edition. Edited by Sebastian P. Brock, Aaron M. Butts, George A. Kiraz and Lucas Van Rompay. Digital edition prepared by David Michelson, Ute Possekel, and Daniel L. Schwartz. Gorgias Press, 2011; online ed. Beth Mardutho, 2018.
- Hastings, H. L. "A historical introduction to the Peshitto Syriac New Testament". in James Murdock. (Translator). (1915). The Syriac New Testament pp. ix ff. 9th ed. Boston: H.L. Hastings.
- Levi della Vida, Giorgio (1960). "Albonesi, Teseo Ambrogio degli". Dizionario Biografico degli Italiani, Volume 2: Albicante–Ammannati (in Italian). Rome: Istituto dell'Enciclopedia Italiana. ISBN 978-8-81200032-6.
- Strohmeyer, Virgil B. The importance of Teseo Ambrogio degli Albonesi's selected Armenian materials for the development of the renaissance's perennial philosophy and an armenological philosophical tradition (1998)
- Wilkinson, R. J., "Teseo Ambrogio and the Maronite Delegation to the Fifth Lateran Council" in Orientalism, Aramaic and Kabbalah in the Catholic Reformation (2007), 11–28.
