= Ignatius John XIV =

Patriarch of Syriac Orthodox Church

Ignatius John XIV bar Shay Allah
- Syriac Orthodox Patriarch of Antioch and All the East
- Church: Syriac Orthodox Church
- Installed: 1483
- Term ended: 1493
- Predecessor: Ignatius Khaleph of Maʿdan
- Successor: Ignatius Noah of Lebanon

Personal details
- Born: John bar Shay Allah; 1442 Mardin, Aq Qoyunlu
- Died: 1493 (aged 50–51)

Ignatius John XIV bar Shay Allah was the Patriarch of Antioch, and head of the Syriac Orthodox Church from 1483 until his death in 1493.

== Biography ==
=== Early life ===
John was the son of Shay Allah, who was the son of Sad al-Din, also known as Ibn al-Asfar, and his family was originally from Bartulli, Iraq. He was born in the city of Mardin in 1442, and became a monk at the Monastery of Mor Hananyo. Whilst at the monastery, John received a special education equal to that of Aziz, the nephew of Ignatius Khaleph of Maʿdan, Patriarch of Antioch, and was educated in Syriac literature by the priests Simon of Amid and John of Mardin, as well as the monks Joshua of Basibrina and David bar Qashafo of Qalat al-Imra'a.

Simon of Amid was a priest at the Church of the Forty Martyrs in Mardin, but died during his education of John and was succeeded by John of Mardin who educated him until he was eighteen. David bar Qashafo taught John astronomy and an anonymous tutor from Constantinople educated him in the use of the use of the astrolabe. John also received an education in dialectics, philosophy, and theology in Mardin, Syria and Egypt.

In 1471, according to official church documents, John was ordained Bishop of Amid, however, it has been argued that the ordination took place in 1474. After his ordination as bishop, John became Ignatius Khaleph's companion and adviser and was put in charge of his financial affairs. John extended his title to Bishop of Amid and Sawro, so named after the village of Sawro near the Monastery of Mor Abay, where he resided. As bishop, John immediately began to restore dilapidated churches and monasteries throughout his diocese, including the Monastery of Mor Abay.

He also restored the monasteries near the village of Qellet and bought and returned land formerly belonging to the monasteries that had been seized by Muslims. As well as this, John built an extension to the Church of the Forty Martyrs in Mardin, and ransomed eight Georgian captives enslaved by Turkish raids. John gifted the Georgians with horses and supplies to help them to return to Georgia. As a result of his building activities, John accumulated large debts to Ibrahim Beg, Emir of Mardin.

=== Patriarchate ===
Following the death of Ignatius Chaleph in 1483, the Syriac Orthodox population of Mardin was divided over who would succeed Chaleph, and John and Baselius Aziz, Maphrian of the East, Chaleph's nephew, and heir presumptive, were the two most popular contenders for the patriarchal throne. Certain bishops subsequently attempted to bribe Ibrahim Beg to usurp the patriarchal throne for themselves. John travelled to meet with Ibrahim Beg alongside the priest John bar Badre and Isa, chief layman of Mardin, and secured his aid so that he may secure the patriarchal throne. John's debts apparently influenced Ibrahim Beg to support John and the emir granted him an official seal of approval and a fine garment.

As patriarch, John continued to build and restore churches and monasteries in the regions of Harput, Se'ert, Mardin, Amid, Nisibis and Mosul, such as the Church of Yoldath Aloho (Mother of God) in Harzam. The patriarch set out to restore a Syriac Orthodox church in the town of Nisibis, which had only three or four Syriac Orthodox households and was largely populated by Nestorians, adherents of a rival church known as the Church of the East. He initially excavated the Church of Mor Jacob with the intention of rebuilding it, but abandoned this effort, and rejected a suggestion to restore the Church of Mor Dimet in the outskirts of Nisibis, as it was too far from the centre. John was shown where the Church of Mor Batlo once stood in the town, and, satisfied by its location, had it excavated. Under Islamic rule, Christians were permitted to only rebuild churches, not build new ones, and thus John, having excavated the ruins of the church, gained official permission from the qadis and faqihs (Islamic jurists) to rebuild the church.

The Nestorians sent a delegation to the Emir of Mardin to protest the reconstruction of the Church of Mor Batlo and claimed there had not been a church there in the past, thus breaking Islamic law, and John was summoned to defend himself. John travelled from Nisibis to Mardin to answer the summons and, with the evidence of the foundations of the original church and the official permission of the qadis and faqihs of Nisibis, the allegations were dismissed and he returned to Nisibis. The Church of Mor Batlo was completed and rededicated as the Church of Mor Batlo and Yoldath Aloho following John's return. John cooperated with Baselius Aziz and the two stayed at the church prior to its consecration. Whilst at the church, John received an apparition of Mor Batlo in a dream who indicated the location of his remains and, in the following morning, John and Baselius Aziz dug at the indicated place and discovered the remains of Mor Batlo. John had a chapel built on the location and connected it to the church. He also appointed a bishop of Nisibis to minister to the Syriac Orthodox population of the town. John's efforts in Nisibis were largely symbolic and were seen as the reclamation of their heritage. This is because the town of Nisibis was the diocese of Jacob of Nisibis, a highly venerated saint in the Syriac Orthodox Church, and thus to appoint a Syriac Orthodox bishop was to reclaim the town from the Nestorians.

Baselius Aziz died shortly after the consecration of the Church of Mor Balto and Yoldath Aloho in 1487 and fear of Nestorian attacks in Mosul led John to travel to the city and restore the nearby Monastery of Mor Behnam. John resolved an issue affecting the Monastery of Mor Hananyo whereby the monks faced harassment from Muslims who lived in a nearby orchard. John threatened the Emir of Mardin that himself and all other members of his church would relocate if the issue was not resolved. The emir capitulated and an agreement was reached by which the aforementioned orchard was exchanged for another property. It was alleged that John was poisoned in 1493 by Joshua, Bishop of Sawro, who would later become patriarch in 1509.

== Bibliography ==
- Barsoum, Ignatius Aphrem (2003). The Scattered Pearls: A History of Syriac Literature and Sciences, trans. Matti Moosa, 2nd rev. ed. Gorgias Press. Archived from the original on 2016-03-04.
- Palmer, Andrew (1990). Monk and Mason on the Tigris Frontier: The Early History of Tur 'Abdin. Cambridge University Press. ISBN 9780521360265.
- Palmer, Andrew (2007). "John bar Shayallah and the Syrian Orthodox community under Aqquyunlu rule in the late 15th century". Christians and Muslims in Dialogue in the Islamic Orient of the Middle Ages. Ergon Publishers.

Preceded by Ignatius Khaleph of Maʿdan	Syriac Orthodox Patriarch of Antioch; 1483–1493	Succeeded by Ignatius Nuh of Lebanon
