= Johann Albrecht Widmannstetter =

Johann Albrecht Widmannstetter, also called Widmannstadt, Johannes Albertus Widmanstadius or Widmestadius, (1506 – 28 March 1557) was a German humanist, orientalist, philologist, and theologian.

== Life ==
Widmannstetter was born in Nellingen/Blaubeuren near Ulm. He studied law, theology and oriental languages in Tübingen. After 1527, he continued his studies in Italy, in Turin, Naples and Rome, focusing on the languages of Syriac and Arabic. In 1533, Widmannstetter became secretary to Pope Clement VII. In the same year, he delivered a series of lectures in Rome, outlining Nicolaus Copernicus' theory to the pope and the cardinals, with which both were impressed.

Pope Clement VII died in 1534, and was succeeded by Pope Paul III; Widmannstetter continued as his secretary.

After 1535, Widmannstetter was secretary of Cardinal Nikolaus von Schönberg. Impressed by Widmannstetter's lessons on Copernicus' ideas, the Cardinal wrote a letter to Copernicus in 1536, urging him to publish (which he would do only in 1543, shortly before his death).

The rest of Widmanstetter's career was focussed on orientalism, to which he contributed a great deal, collecting hundreds of manuscripts in Hebrew, Arabic and Syriac. Widmannstetter is considered to be a founder of European orientalism. He died in Regensburg, and his personal library was acquired by Albert V, Duke of Bavaria.

=== Selected work ===
- 1541/42: Sacrarum ceremoniarum sive rituum ecclesiasticorum sanctae romanae ecclesiae libri tres
- 1543: Notae contra Mohammedis dogmata
- 1552: Von den geistlichen und weltlichen Wappen eines Ritters (Dillingen)
- 1555: Liber sacrosancti Evangelii de Jesu Christo Domino et Deo nostro (Vienna)
- 1555: Syriacae linguae ... prima elementa (Vienna); also published in Antwerp in 1572

=== Literature ===
- Max Müller (1907): Johann Albrecht von Widmanstetter 1506-1557. Sein Leben und Wirken. Bamberg.
- Hans Striedl (1952): "Die Bücherei des Orientalisten Johann Albrecht Widmanstetter." In: Hans Joachim Kissling (ed.): Serta Monacensia. Leiden, pp. 200–244.
- Hans Striedl (1953): Der Humanist Johann Albrecht Widmanstetter als klassischer Philologe. In: Festgabe der Bayerischen Staatsbibliothek für Emil Gratzl. Wiesbaden. Pages 96–120.
