= St. Mary Church, Diyarbakır =

Syriac Orthodox church in Diyarbakir, Turkey

St. Mary Church
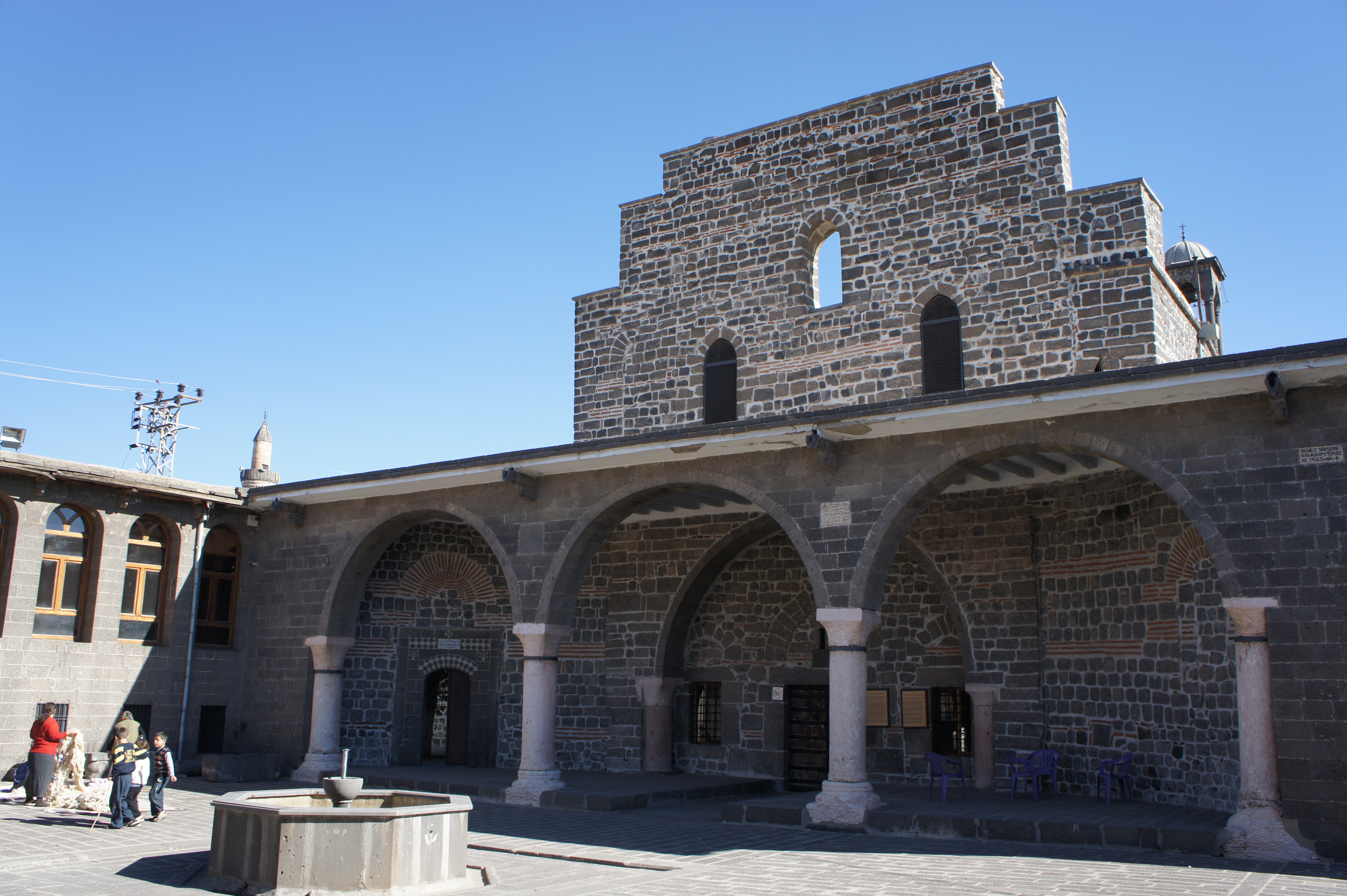
- St. Mary Church
- 37.9089°N 40.2306°E
- Location: Diyarbakir, Turkey
- Country: Turkey
- Denomination: Syriac Orthodox

Architecture
- Completed: 3rd century, AD

Clergy
- Bishop: Rev. Fr. Yusuf Akbulut

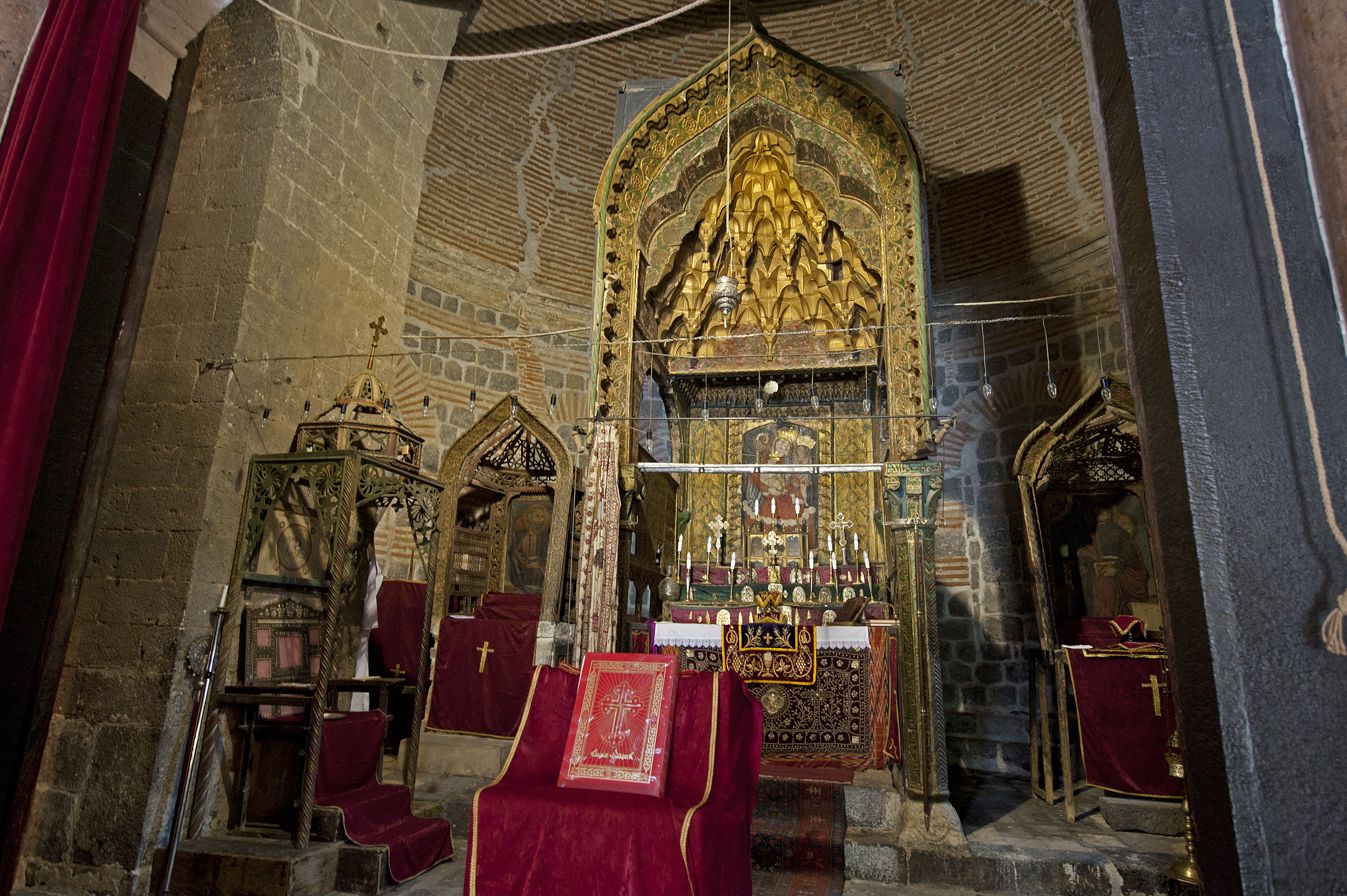
St. Mary Church, Diyarbakır.

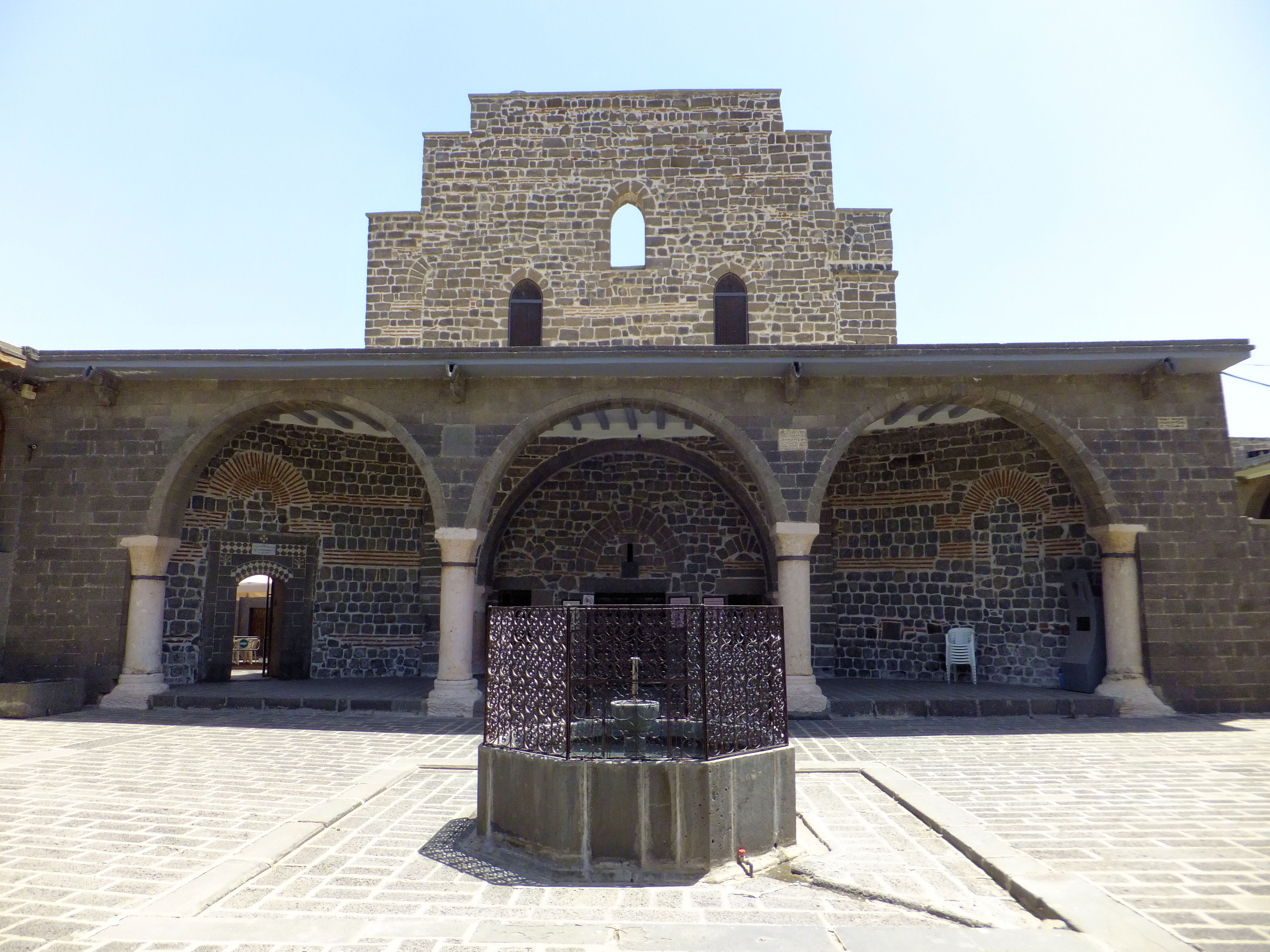
St. Mary Church, Diyarbakır.

St. Mary Church (Syriac: ܥܕܬܐ ܕܝܠܕܬ ܐܠܗܐ `Idto d-Yoldat Aloho, Turkish: Meryemana kilisesi), is a Syriac Orthodox church in Diyarbakir. It is under the jurisdiction of the Syriac Archdiocese of Mardin, headed by Metropolitan Mor Filüksinos Saliba Özmen. The church was first constructed as a pagan temple in the 1st century BC, and the current construction dates back to the 3rd century. The church has been restored many times, and is still in use as a place of worship today. The church is open to visitors for a 5 lira entrance fee.

== History ==
When Diyarbakir was known by its Syriac name Amid, it was the seat of some of the Patriarchs of the Assyrian Church of the East and thus an original Assyrian/Syriac stronghold that produced many famous theologians and Patriarchs. There are many relics in the Church, such as the bones of the apostle Thomas and St. Jacob of Sarug. The church also has a large and very significant collection of manuscripts.
