= Dioceses of the Syriac Orthodox Church =

Administrative units of church

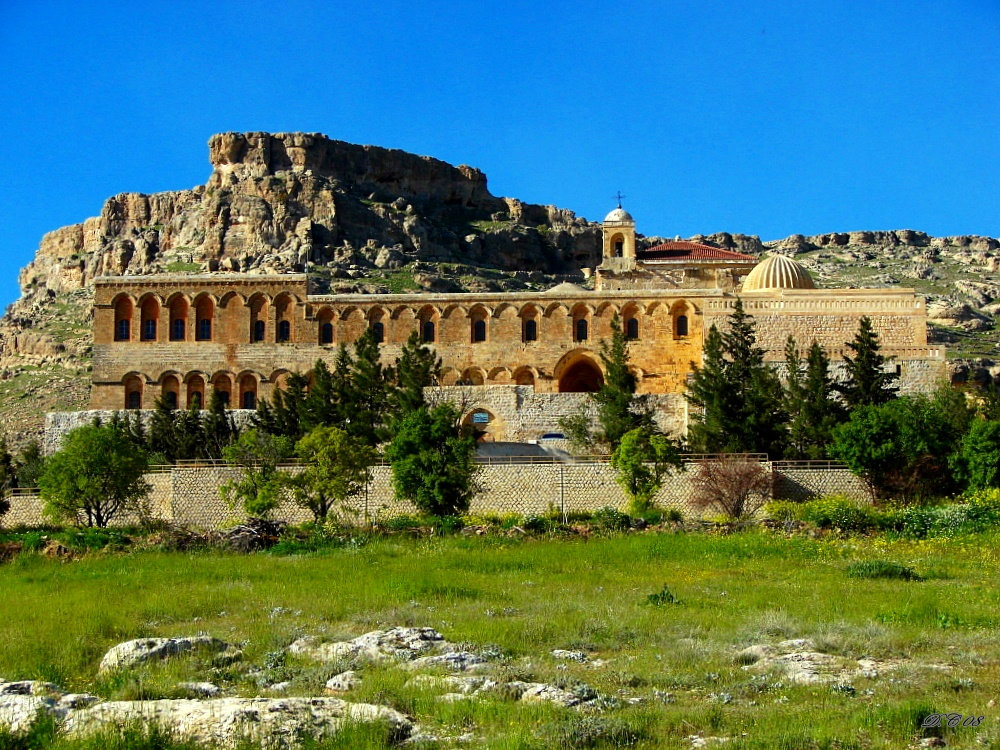
Deir Zaʿfaran, the 'saffron monastery', seat of the Syriac Orthodox patriarchs after the First World War

In the period of its greatest expansion, in the tenth century, the Syriac Orthodox Church had around 20 metropolitan dioceses and a little over a hundred suffragan dioceses. By the seventeenth century, only 20 dioceses remained, reduced in the twentieth century to 10. The seat of Syriac Orthodox Patriarch of Antioch was at Mardin before the First World War, and thereafter in Deir Zaʿfaran, from 1932 in Homs, and finally from 1959 in Damascus.

== Syriac Orthodox Church before the Arab invasions ==
When the Syriac Orthodox movement began in the sixth century, the Christian world was organised into five patriarchates: Rome, Constantinople, Antioch, Alexandria and Jerusalem. The Syriac Orthodox movement was initially confined to the eastern provinces of the Roman Empire, in the territory of the patriarchates of Antioch and Jerusalem. Syriac Orthodox Christians envisaged their church as the legitimate patriarchate of Antioch from the line continuing from Severus of Antioch.

== Syriac Orthodox Church under the caliphate ==
Map showing historical localities in Northern Mesopotamia and Syria

Dioceses of the Syriac Orthodox Church of Antioch during the Middle Ages

Over a hundred Syriac Orthodox dioceses and around a thousand bishops are attested between the sixth and thirteenth centuries. The main sources for these dioceses and bishops are the lists of Michael the Syrian, compiled in the twelfth century. Many other dioceses and bishops are mentioned in other literary sources, particularly the works of Bar Hebraeus, written in the second half of the thirteenth century. Several bishops not known either to Michael the Syrian or Bar Hebraeus are mentioned in the colophons of surviving West Syriac manuscripts.

=== Syria ===
Eight Syriac Orthodox dioceses are known to have existed at various periods before the fourteenth century in southern Syria, in the areas covered by the Chalcedonian province of Phoenicia Libanesia and the southern part of the province of Euphratensis. There was a Syriac Orthodox diocese for Damascus, first attested in the seventh century. The diocese persisted into the fourteenth century and appears to have been one of the few Syriac Orthodox dioceses which continued undisturbed into the fifteenth century and beyond. Emesa (Homs) and Palmyra (Tadmor) also had Syriac Orthodox dioceses. There was an ephemeral Jacobite diocese for the coastal port of Laodicea (Latakia) in the ninth century; and an ephemeral Jacobite diocese for Sadad, a town between Damascus and Homs, in the twelfth century.

There was also a Syriac Orthodox diocese for Heliopolis (Baalbek), attested between the seventh and eleventh centuries; and a diocese for Kfar Tab near Homs, attested in the eleventh and twelfth centuries. No record has survived of Syriac Orthodox bishops in the other towns in Phoenicia Libanesia with known Chalcedonian dioceses (Salamias, Evaria, Iabruda, Abila and Chonochora), though Iabruda certainly had a Syriac Orthodox community. As far as the southern part of the Chalcedonian province of Euphratensis is concerned, a Syriac Orthodox diocese is attested for Sergiopolis (Resafa) in the ninth and tenth centuries.

Nine Syriac Orthodox dioceses are known to have existed at various periods before the fourteenth century in northern Syria. The diocese of Apamea, which was the seat of a metropolitan by the eighth century, is attested between the seventh and tenth centuries; Seleucia Pieria in the eighth and ninth centuries; Berrhoea (Aleppo) between the seventh and late-thirteenth centuries; Beth Balesh between the eighth and eleventh centuries; Cyrrhus between the eighth and eleventh centuries; Qenneshrin between the eighth and tenth centuries; Mabbugh between the ninth and twelfth centuries; Gishra between the eighth and tenth centuries; and Karshena (Gudpaï) in the eleventh and twelfth centuries.

The diocese of Gishra was incorporated into the diocese of Mabbugh during the reign of Athanasius IV (987–1003), and Mabbugh in turn was incorporated into the diocese of Marʿash in the Commagene district in 1155. It is unlikely that any of these dioceses, with the possible exception of Aleppo, persisted beyond the early years of the fourteenth century. Although an almost unbroken succession of bishops of Aleppo is attested from the early years of the sixteenth century onwards, no fourteenth- or fifteenth-century bishops of Aleppo are known. It seems likely that the diocese of Aleppo lapsed after the death of its bishop Mikha'il, attested in 1298, and was only revived at the beginning of the sixteenth century.

=== Palestine ===
There were two stable Syriac Orthodox dioceses in Palestine between the Eighth and Twelfth Centuries, one for the Golan region (whose bishops sat first at Paneas and later at Tiberias) and the other for Jerusalem. The Syriac Orthodox bishops of Golan resided at Paneas, the classical city of Caesarea Philippi, during the seventh and eighth centuries; and at Tiberias in the ninth, tenth and eleventh centuries. Jerusalem was the seat of a Syriac Orthodox bishop at least as early as the eighth century. For most of the period covered by the lists of Michael the Syrian, both dioceses had metropolitan bishops. The diocese of Tiberias lapsed in the twelfth century but the diocese of Jerusalem, whose bishops may have resided in Tripolis for several decades after the recapture of Jerusalem by the Moslems in 1240, seems to have persisted into the fourteenth century. A short-lived Syriac Orthodox diocese of ʿAkko was also established in the Crusader stronghold of Acre in the thirteenth century, which doubtless lapsed after the fall of Acre to the Mamluks in 1291.

=== Cilicia ===
Eleven separate Syriac Orthodox dioceses are attested at various periods in Cilicia, the most important of which seem to have been Tarsus, Adana and Anazarbus. Tarsus, the metropolis of the Chalcedonian province of Cilicia Prima, is first mentioned as a Syriac Orthodox diocese in the seventh century, and survived as the seat of a Syriac Orthodox bishop or metropolitan until the end of the thirteenth century, the only Cilician diocese which appears to have persisted for so long. Syriac Orthodox bishops, and later metropolitans, of both Adana and Anazarbus are attested between the seventh and twelfth centuries. Other Syriac Orthodox dioceses attested between the seventh and tenth centuries include Citidiopolis (seventh century), Hamam (ninth to twelfth centuries), Hanzit (ninth century), Kinisa (ninth century) and Irenopolis (ninth and tenth centuries).

As a frontier province of the Roman empire, Cilicia was affected by the varying fortunes of war, and three later dioceses reflected Christian successes against the Arabs. Part of Cilicia was settled by Syriac Orthodox Christians in the tenth century, and a diocese of Gihon, created at this period, persisted into the twelfth century. Its bishops sat in the Monastery of Bārid, and the diocese is sometimes referred to as 'Gihon and Barid'. A Syriac Orthodox diocese of Kalinag, in eastern Cilicia, is attested in the eleventh century. A Syriac Orthodox diocese for Sis, then under Armenian rule, was established in the second half of the thirteenth century, whose bishops normally resided in the monastery of Gawikath. One of the bishops of Sis claimed the title of patriarch around the end of the thirteenth century and founded a line of patriarchs which persisted into the fifteenth century.

=== Cappadocia ===
Seventeen Syriac Orthodox dioceses are known to have existed at various periods before the fourteenth century in Cappadocia. The diocese of Melitene, which seems to have been the seat of a metropolitan from the late ninth century onwards, is attested between the seventh and thirteenth centuries; Simandu (also the seat of a metropolitan) between the tenth and twelfth centuries; Zuptara between the eighth and eleventh centuries; Gubos and Qlisura between the ninth and thirteenth centuries; ʿArqa, Gargar, Laqabin and Qlaudia between the tenth and thirteenth centuries; Tel Patriq in the eleventh and twelfth centuries; Hisn Mansur, Hisn Ziyad (Harput) and Semha between the eleventh and thirteenth centuries; Caesarea in Cappadocia in the twelfth and thirteenth centuries; and Guma in the thirteenth century. There were also ephemeral dioceses for Arabissus around the end of the tenth century and for Romana in the twelfth century. It is doubtful whether any of these dioceses, with the possible exceptions of Gargar and Hisn Ziyad, persisted into the fourteenth century. The dioceses of Gargar and Hisn Ziyad are again attested from the late fourteenth and mid-fifteenth century respectively, but may have been revived, as no bishops of either diocese are known for more than a century before they are again mentioned.

=== Commagene ===
Nine Syriac Orthodox dioceses are known to have existed before the fourteenth century in the Commagene district. The diocese of Samosata, which appears to have been the seat of a metropolitan from the late eighth century onwards, is attested between the sixth and twelfth centuries; Germanicea (Marʿash) between the seventh and twelfth centuries; Urim between the eighth and ninth centuries; Dolikh between the ninth and eleventh centuries; Hadath between the eighth and eleventh centuries; Kaisum between the eighth and twelfth centuries; Zeugma between the ninth and twelfth centuries; Raʿban between the eleventh and thirteenth centuries; and Tel Bshir (an ephemeral diocese in Crusader territory) in the twelfth century. It is doubtful whether any of these dioceses persisted into the fourteenth century.

=== Osrhoene ===
Seven Syriac Orthodox dioceses are known to have existed in Osrhoene before the fourteenth century: the metropolitan diocese of Edessa, attested between the seventh and fourteenth centuries; Callinicus (Raqqa), which also became the seat of a metropolitan in the ninth century, between the eighth and thirteenth centuries; Sarugh (Batna) between the eighth and twelfth centuries; Harran between the seventh and thirteenth centuries; Sibaberek (Severek) in the twelfth century; Khabur between the eighth and thirteenth centuries; and Tella d'Mauzalath (ancient Constantina, modern Viransehir) between the seventh and tenth centuries. None of these dioceses seem to have survived into the fourteenth century.

=== Amid ===
Four substantial Syriac Orthodox dioceses are known to have existed before the fourteenth century in the Amid region: the dioceses of Amid and Maiperqat, attested between the seventh and thirteenth centuries; the diocese of Arsamosata, attested between the ninth and twelfth centuries; and the diocese of Hattakh, first mentioned towards the end of the thirteenth century. Bar Hebraeus also mentions a bishop of Aspharin, an ephemeral diocese carved out of the diocese of Amid by the patriarch Iwanis I (740–55), which existed for only a few years in the middle of the eighth century. The dioceses of Amid and Maiperqat persisted into the fourteenth century. The diocese of Hattakh, first mentioned in 1293, is not again mentioned until 1479, and it is not clear whether it survived into the fourteenth century or was later revived.

=== Arzun ===
The Arzun region had three stable Syriac Orthodox dioceses before the fourteenth century: Arzun, attested between the seventh and twelfth centuries; Armenia (Akhlat), attested between the ninth and eleventh centuries; and Hesna d’Kifa, first attested in the eighth century. A short-lived diocese was also established at the end of the eighth century for Qalinqala (ancient Theodosiopolis, modern Erzerum), 'a city of Armenia'. Wastan, a city on the shore of Lake Van, was also a Jacobite diocese in the second half of the tenth century, but does not seem to have persisted into the eleventh century.

=== Mardin ===
Four stable Syriac Orthodox dioceses are known to have existed at various periods before the fourteenth century in the Mardin district. The diocese of Mardin is first attested in the seventh century, and has persisted without interruption up to the present day. The diocese of Tel Beshme is attested between the eighth and tenth centuries, and was revived for a few decades in the twelfth century. The diocese of Rishʿaina is attested between the seventh and eleventh centuries; and the diocese of Rish Kipa between the eighth and tenth centuries. An ephemeral diocese of Kfartutha, normally associated with Mardin, is attested in the seventh century, but may have been later revived; and a single bishop is also attested for Baghdashiya in the thirteenth century. In the first half of the twelfth century the dioceses of Dara, Nisibis, Harran, Khabur, Kfartutha and Tel Beshme were temporarily united with the diocese of Mardin owing to a steep decline in the number of Christians in the region. With the exception of Mardin itself, it is doubtful whether any of these dioceses persisted into the fourteenth century.

=== Nisibis ===
In the Nisibis region, there were dioceses for Nisibis, Dara and Maʿarre.

=== Tur Abdin ===
Despite its later central importance in the history of the Syriac Orthodox Church, only two Syriac Orthodox dioceses are known to have existed before the thirteenth century in the Tur ʿAbdin. The diocese of Qartmin, whose bishops sat in the celebrated monastery of Mar Gabriel (Qartmin Abbey), is attested from the sixth century onwards; and the diocese of Tur ʿAbdin, whose bishops sat in the monastery of the Cross near the village of Hah, from the eleventh century. Confusingly, bishops of both these dioceses often bore the title 'Tur ʿAbdin'. By the end of the thirteenth century there was a third diocese, whose bishops sat in the monastery of Mar Yaʿqob the Recluse near the village of Salah, and possibly a fourth, whose bishops sat in the monastery of Mar Abai near the village of Sawro. The dioceses of Salah and Sawro, both of which persisted for several centuries, are first reliably attested in 1283 and 1312 respectively, and references in hagiographies to sixth- and seventh-century bishops of these dioceses cannot be trusted.

=== Iraq ===
Two Syriac Orthodox dioceses, Beth Nuhadra and Gumal, were established in the ʿAmadiya region before the end of the sixth century, and were among the dioceses placed under the jurisdiction of the maphrians. The diocese of Beth Nuhadra, whose bishops sat initially in the monastery of Nardos near Deir Jundi and later in the town of Maʿaltha near Dohuk, is attested between the sixth and thirteenth centuries, usually under the name Beth Nuhadra but occasionally under the name Maʿaltha. The diocese of Gumal, which seems to have covered the Marga district, is attested between the sixth and tenth centuries, but may have persisted into the thirteenth century. The last-known bishop of Beth Nuhadra was consecrated in 1284, and is unlikely to have had a successor.

A diocese was established for the Mosul region, whose bishops sat in the monastery of Mar Mattai, in the seventh century. This diocese seems to have persisted without a break up to the present day. A diocese was also established for Gazarta in the ninth century.

Two Syriac Orthodox dioceses are known to have existed in the Beth ʿArabaye region between the sixth and fourteenth centuries, centred on Balad and Shigar (Sinjar) respectively. They were among the Syriac Orthodox dioceses placed under the jurisdiction of the maphrians towards the end of the sixth century. Several bishops of Beth ʿArabaye are attested between the sixth and ninth centuries, and again between the twelfth and fourteenth centuries. They were variously styled bishops of 'Beth ʿArabaye', 'Balad' or 'the monastery of Mar Sargis', and probably resided in the monastery of Mar Sargis near Balad. Several bishops of Shigar are attested between 630 and 818, but the diocese is not again mentioned until 1277. It is possible that for much of the intervening period Shigar was under the jurisdiction of the bishops of Beth ʿArabaye. The dioceses of Balad and Shigar both survived into the fourteenth century.

In the Erbil region there were dioceses for Beth Ramman and Beth Waziq (seventh to thirteenth centuries) and for Shahrzur. In the second half of the thirteenth century an ad hoc diocese was created for Syriac Orthodox refugees from the Mosul region who settled in and around the Erbil village of Beth Sayyade, with the title of Beth Takshur (a Syriac Orthodox village near Mosul).

In central Iraq, a Syriac Orthodox diocese for Baghdad, the capital of the ʿAbbasid caliphate, is attested between the ninth and thirteenth centuries. There were also Syriac Orthodox dioceses for Tagrit, Karma (seventh to thirteenth centuries), Bahrin, Piroz Shabur, Karsabak, ʿAqula, and the Bani Taghlib Arabs (seventh to tenth centuries).

=== Iran and Central Asia ===
In western Iran there were dioceses for Adarbaigan and Tabriz.

Four substantial Syriac Orthodox dioceses are known to have existed before the fourteenth century in eastern Iran and Central Asia: Zarang (or Segestan), attested between the seventh and thirteenth centuries; Gurgan (later renamed Abaskun) to the south of the Caspian Sea between the eighth and tenth centuries; Aprah in Segestan between the eighth and eleventh centuries; and Herat, also between the eighth and eleventh centuries.

Two other dioceses are mentioned only once, and may have been ephemeral. The unlocalised diocese of Khorasan, apparently to be distinguished from both Aprah and Herat, is mentioned in the first half of the ninth century in the lists of Michael the Syrian. The diocese of Beth Parsaye (literally, 'the country of the Persians') also features in the lists of Michael the Syrian for the same period, and has been tentatively localised by Dauvillier in eastern Iran.

=== Ephemeral and unlocalised dioceses ===
Several other Syriac Orthodox dioceses appear to have been ephemeral, including Ibidinge (in Isauria) in the seventh century, Junia (Lebanon), Gulia (in the Melitene district), Kfar Bat (unlocalised) and Kfar Kila (in Lebanon) in the ninth century, Halys (in northeast Turkey) and Hassassa (near Tagrit) in the tenth century, Gudpaï (southern Turkey), Hauran (near the Syrian border with Jordan) and Hezza (near Maiperqat) in the eleventh century, and Hisn Jaʿbar (on the Euphrates, in Iraq) in the twelfth century.

Several Syriac Orthodox dioceses mentioned in the lists of Michael the Syrian cannot be even approximately localised: Harara (attested in 685), Dirig (end of the eighth century), Deboraitha (ninth century), Dula (ninth and tenth centuries), Helbon (ninth to eleventh centuries), Qadmanaye (eighth and ninth centuries), and Shalabdin (twelfth century).

== The Syriac Orthodox Church in the Mongol and Post-Mongol Period ==
It is clear that the late thirteenth century was a period of disruption for the Syriac Orthodox Church. According to a famous passage of Bar Hebraeus, several Syriac Orthodox dioceses were depopulated in the 1270s, and some (though not all) may never have recovered:

Even if I wanted to be patriarch, as many others do, what is there to covet in the appointment, since so many dioceses of the East have been devastated? Should I set my heart on Antioch, where sighs and groans will meet me? Or the holy diocese of Gumal, where nobody is left to piss against a wall? Or Aleppo, or Mabbugh, or Callinicus, or Edessa, or Harran, all deserted? Or Laqabin, ʿArqa, Qlisura, Semha, Gubos, Qlaudia and Gargar—the seven dioceses around Melitene—where not a soul remains?

As with the Church of the East, it seems likely that a number of Syriac Orthodox dioceses in Mesopotamia came to an end in the fourteenth century. Only six Syriac Orthodox dioceses which existed at the end of the thirteenth century definitely persisted into the sixteenth century: Amid, Damascus, Gazarta, Hah, Mardin and Qartmin. Other dioceses, such as Homs, Jerusalem, Aleppo (for which no bishops are known for the whole of the fourteenth and fifteenth centuries), the monastery of Mar Mattai (for which no bishops are known for the whole of the thirteenth century), Gargar (for which no bishops are known for the whole of the thirteenth century), Hisn Ziyad (for which no bishops are known for the whole of the fourteenth century), and Maiperqat, may also have persisted undisturbed, but at present there is insufficient evidence to be certain, and they may all have been revived after lapsing for long periods. The diocese of Edessa seems to have come to an end after the city's depopulation in 1283, and by the beginning of the sixteenth century Edessa was included in the title of the metropolitans of Gargar.

Several dioceses in Iraq came to an end during the fourteenth century, some possibly during the terrible campaigns of Timur Leng. In 1330 the dioceses of Beth ʿArabaye and Sinjar were combined, with the consecration of a bishop 'of the monastery of Mar Sargis and Sinjar', who probably resided in the monastery of Mar Sargis near Balad. This diocese is not mentioned again, and by the sixteenth century the small Syriac Orthodox communities remaining in the Beth ʿArabaye region came under the authority of the bishops of Tur ʿAbdin, who occasionally included Sinjar in their titles.

Syriac villages and monasteries in Tur Abdin.

However, the picture was not all gloom. Several Jacobite dioceses were created or revived between the thirteenth and sixteenth centuries, particularly in the Tur ʿAbdin region, which increasingly became the heartland of the Syriac Orthodox Church. In Lebanon, which had never previously been the seat of a Jacobite bishop, two Jacobite dioceses are attested in the fifteenth and sixteenth centuries, one for Hama and Hardin and the other for Tripoli. A Jacobite diocese was also established in Cyprus in the thirteenth century, initially for Jacobite refugees and later for Jacobite merchants from the Mosul region, which persisted into the seventeenth century despite sporadic Latin persecution. In northern Mesopotamia new dioceses were created for Maʿdan towards the end of the fourteenth century, and for Zargel (whose bishops sat in the monastery of Mar Quriaqos) by the middle of the fifteenth century. The monastery of Mar Mushe the Ethiopian near Nebek was restored in 1556 and became the seat of a bishop shortly afterwards.

Five dioceses were created in the Tur ʿAbdin region during the Mongol and post-Mongol period. The diocese of Salah, whose bishops sat in the monastery of Mar Yaʿqob the Recluse, is first mentioned in 1283, and was probably created in the second half of the thirteenth century. The diocese of Sawro, whose bishops sat in the monastery of Mar Abai, is first mentioned in 1312. A third diocese, Beth Rishe, whose bishops sat in the monastery of Mar Malke near the village of Hbab, is attested before the end of the fourteenth century. A fourth diocese, Natfa near Mardin, was created in the fourteenth century and persisted into the nineteenth century. A new diocese seems to have been created for Midyat in the fourteenth century. The title of the diocese also included Hesna d'Kifa, whose Syriac Orthodox diocese lapsed in the eleventh century, and it is not clear whether its bishops sat in the monastery of Mar Abraham near Midyat or in the monastery of the Cross near Hesna d'Kifa. By the end of the sixteenth century the diocese was divided, and thereafter both Midyat and Hesna d'Kifa had their own bishops, with the bishops of Hesna d’Kifa sitting in the monastery of the Cross at al-ʿItafiya.

In the Mosul region, which had long had only the single diocese of the monastery of Mar Mattai, a new diocese was created in the middle of the sixteenth century, whose bishops sat in the monastery of Mar Behnam near Beth Khudaida (Qaraqosh).

By the sixteenth century certain names had become relatively firmly associated with particular dioceses, and were almost invariably taken by their bishops. The name Yohannan, for example, was associated with the diocese of Qartmin, and Dionysius with Aleppo.

== The Syriac Orthodox Church in the nineteenth century ==
In 1792 or 1793 a separate Syriac Orthodox diocese was created for Mosul, hitherto under the jurisdiction of the diocese of Mar Mattai, in response to the consecration of a Syriac Catholic bishop for Mosul in 1790.

In the 1840s, shortly after it recovered the ancient monastery of Mar Awgin from the East Syrians, the Syriac Orthodox church revived the old diocese of Nisibis. Four Syriac Orthodox bishops of Nisibis sat in the monastery of Mar Awgin up to the outbreak of the First World War.

== The Syriac Orthodox Church in the twentieth century ==
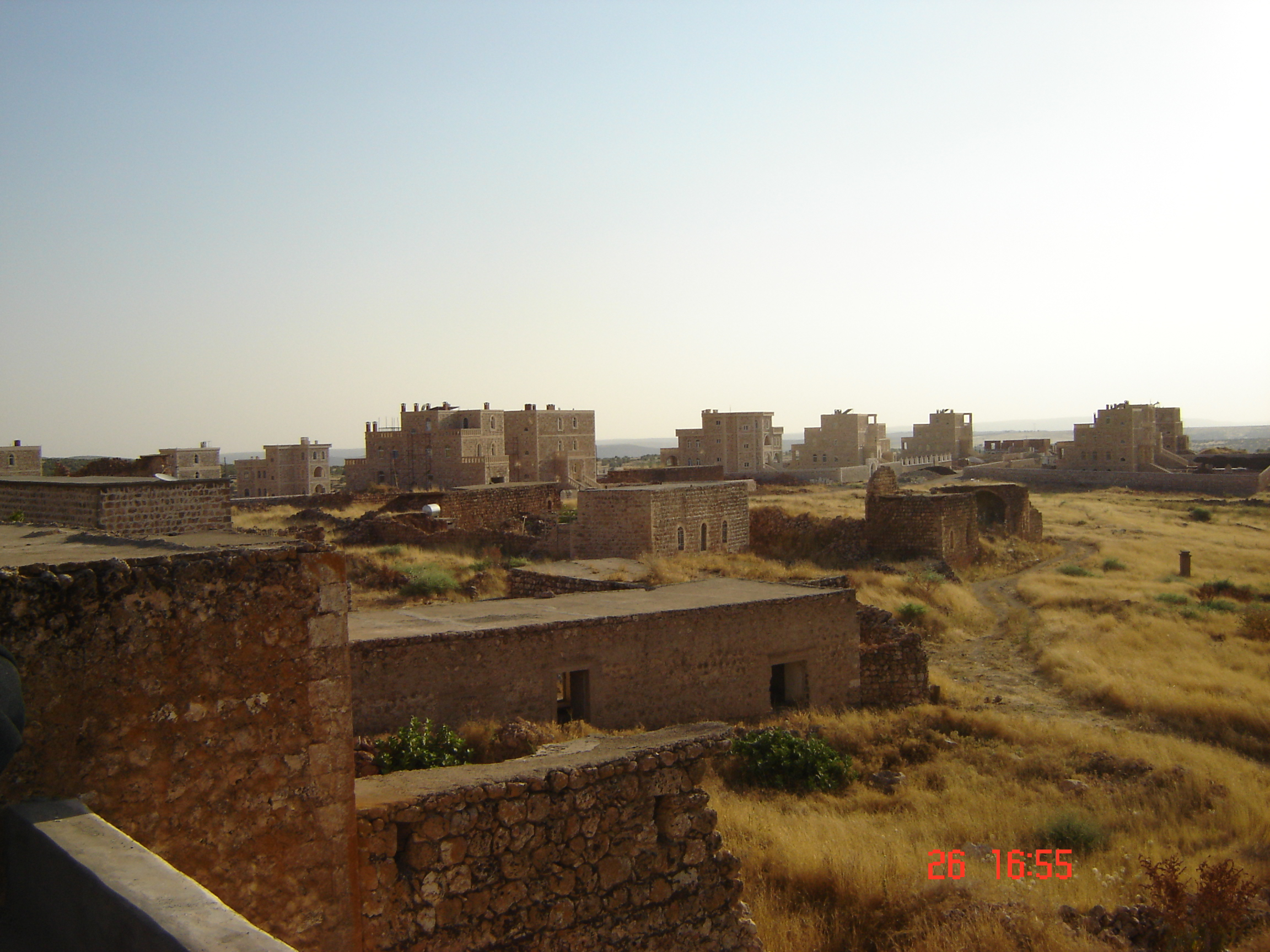
Syriac village of Kafro, recently resettled by European Syriac returnees

The Syriac Orthodox dioceses of Amid, Mardin and Gazarta were ruined in the First World War (Dioscorus Bar Sawma, the Syriac Orthodox bishop of Gazarta, was among the members of the Syriac Orthodox hierarchy murdered by the Turks and their Kurdish auxiliaries in 1915), and were not revived after the war.

In 1921 there was a large migration of Syriac Orthodox refugees from Turkey into the new French mandate of Syria. As a result, the Syriac refugee population of the districts around Hassakeh, ʿAmuda and Ra's al-ʿAïn was placed in 1929 under the jurisdiction of the bishop Athanasius Thomas Qsir of Aleppo, who took the title Aleppo, Jazira and Khabur. In 1933 these districts were detached and organised into a separate diocese of Jazira and Khabur (renamed Jazira and Euphrates in 1943), whose bishops sat in the town of Hassakeh.

Since the Second World War the Syriac Orthodox Church has established a number of dioceses and patriarchal vicariates for its diaspora in America and Europe. In America the church established a diocese for North America and Canada in 1957, and patriarchal vicariates for Brazil and Argentina in 1982. In Europe the church established a diocese of Central Europe and Benelux in 1977 and a diocese for Sweden and Scandinavia in 1978. In 1987 a separate diocese was created for the United Kingdom, previously part of the diocese of Sweden. The church also has a 'diocese of patriarchal institutions', whose bishop sits at ʿAtshaneh in Lebanon.

According to a Catholic statistic of 1962, the Syriac Orthodox Church at that time had a total of 130,000 members, of whom 115,000 members lived in the Middle East.

== Jurisdiction of the Patriarchate ==
The Syriac Orthodox Church of Antioch originally covered the whole region of the Middle East and India. However, in recent centuries, its parishioners started to emigrate to other countries all over the world. Today, the Syriac Orthodox Church has several Archdioceses and Patriarchal Vicariates (exarchates) in many countries covering six continents.

=== Asia ===
Middle East

Syriac Orthodox Christians in the Middle East, known simply as Syriacs (Suryoye), are an ethnic subgroup who follow the West Syrian Rite Syriac Orthodox Church in the Middle East and the diaspora, numbering between 150,000 and 200,000 people in their indigenous area of habitation in Syria, Iraq, and Turkey according to estimations.

The community formed and developed in the Near East in the Middle Ages. The Syriac Orthodox Christians of the Middle East speak Neo-Aramaic (their original and liturgical language) Arabic, and in the case of Assyrians in Turkey, sometimes Turkish. The traditional cultural and religious center of the Syriac Orthodox is Tur Abdin, regarded as their homeland, in southeastern Turkey, from where many people fled the Ottoman government-organized genocide (1914–18) to Syria and Lebanon.

Syria

The Patriarch of Antioch and All the East, the Supreme Head of the Universal Syriac Orthodox Church Ignatius Aphrem II.

1. Patriarchal Vicariate for the Archdiocese of Damascus under the spiritual guidance and direction of Archbishop Kyrillos Babi. (see Patriarchal Archdiocese of Damascus)
2. Archbishopric of Jazirah and Euphrates under the spiritual guidance and direction of acting Archbishop Maurice Amsih.
3. Archbishopric of Aleppo under the spiritual guidance and direction of Archbishop Yohanna Ibrahim. (see Syriac Orthodox Archdiocese of Aleppo)
4. Archbishopric of Homs & Hama under the spiritual guidance and direction of Archbishop Timotheos Matta Al-Khoury. (see Syriac Orthodox Archdiocese of Homs)

Syriac Orthodox Church is one of eight Christian denominations in the country. They are most heavily concentrated in Al Hasakah Governorate (or the Jazira region) in villages along the Khabur river such as Tal Tamer where they make up a majority along with other Syriac Christian people groups. They also established the cities of Hasakah and Qamishli in the Governorate after the 1915 massacres, when many Christian people fled Turkey. In the mid-1970s it was estimated that 82,000 Syriac Orthodox lived in the country, but this number is now estimated at 400,000 in 2016 including other Assyrian groups. Part of the reason for this increase is due to an influx of Iraqi refugees after the 2003 invasion along with natural population growth over a 40-year period. Other centers of Syriac Orthodox people outside of Jazira include Fairouzeh, Al-Hafar, Kafr Ram, Maskanah, Al-Qaryatayn, Sadad and Zaidal. Other cities include Damascus, where Their Patriarchate is centered in since 1959., and Homs. The shelling of Homs in 2012 damaged the city and dispersed much of its population, which was until then home to a large Christian community of various denominations.

Holy Land
1. Archbishopric of Israel, Palestine and Jordan was under the spiritual guidance and direction of Archbishop Jack yacoub . (see Syriac Orthodox Archdiocese of Jerusalem and Holy Land)

Iraq
1. Archbishopric of Baghdad and Basrah under the spiritual guidance and direction of Archbishop Severius Jamil Hawa.(see Syriac Orthodox Archdiocese of Baghdad and Basra)
2. Archbishopric of Mosul, Kirkuk and Kurdistan under the spiritual guidance and direction of Archbishop Nicodimus Dawood Sharaf. Served previously by the retired Archbishop but currently Patriarch Advisor Gregorius Saliba Shamoun.
3. Archbishopric of St Matthew's Monastery under the spiritual guidance and direction of Archbishop Timothius Mousa Shamani.

The Syriac Community in Iraq mainly live in Mosul and the Nineveh Plains region of Northern Iraq in the towns of Merki, Iraq, Bartella, Bakhdida, and Karamlesh. An estimated 15–20,000 Syriac Orthodox Christians lived there in 1991. Since the 1960s many have moved south, to Baghdad. The most recent estimations (2014) of their total population in Iraq number between 30,000 and 40,000 or 50,000–70,000. Historically, the Assyrians of the Nineveh Plains and Northern Iraq originated from Tikrit, but immigrated to the north during a period between 1089 and the 1400s due to persecution and a genocide by Timur.

Lebanon
1. Archbishopric of Mount Lebanon under the spiritual guidance and direction of Archbishop Chrysostomos Mikhael Chamoun.(see Syriac Orthodox Archdiocese of Mount Lebanon)
2. Patriarchal Vicariate of Zahle under the spiritual guidance and direction of Archbishop Justinos Boulos Safar.
3. Archbishopric of Beirut & Benevolent institutions in Lebanon under the spiritual guidance and direction of Archbishop Clemis Daniel Malak Kourieh.(see Syriac Orthodox Archdiocese of Beirut)
4. The Patriarchal Institutions in Lebanon under the spiritual guidance and direction of Archbishop Chrysostomos Michael Shamoun.

Syriac Orthodox Christians are one of several Christian minority groups in Lebanon. A Jacobite community settled in Lebanon among the Maronites after Mongol invasions in the Late Middle Ages, however, this community was either dispersed or absorbed by the Maronites. Assemani (1687–1768) noted that many Maronite families were of Jacobite origin. A Jacobite community was present in Tripoli in the 17th century. The 1915 events forced Syriac Orthodox from Tur Abdin to flee to Lebanon, where they formed communities in the Beirut districts of Zahlah and Musaytbeh. Syriac Refugees from French Cilicia arrived in 1921 to bolster their numbers. In 1944 it was estimated that 3,753 Syriac Orthodox lived in Lebanon. Prior to the Lebanese Civil War (1975–1990), there were 65,000 Syriac Orthodox in the country. Half of the community emigrated as a result of violence, with many going to Sweden which protected "stateless people". As of 1987 there were only a few thousand Syriac Orthodox in Lebanon. The Syria conflict has resulted in an influx of Syrian Christian refugees, with many being Syriac Christians.

Turkey
1. Archbishopric of Istanbul and Ankara under the spiritual guidance and direction of Archbishop Filüksinos Yusuf Çetin.
2. Patriarchal Vicariate of Mardin under the spiritual guidance and direction of Archbishop Filüksinos Saliba Özmen.
3. Patriarchal Vicariate of Turabdin under the spiritual guidance and direction of Archbishop Timotheus Samuel Aktaş.
4. Archbishopric of Adiyaman under the spiritual guidance and direction of Archbishop Gregorius Melki Ürek.

The Syriac community of Turkey identifies as Sūryōyō, historically as Sūrōyō or Sūrōyē (until 20 years ago). The identity characteristics defining the Assyrians of Tur Abdin is the Neo-Aramaic language and the Syriac Orthodox Church, and their religious identity correlates to an ethnic identity. Intermarriage between Assyrians and other Christian groups (Armenians and Greeks) is therefore very rare. Unlike some other Syriac Christian religious communities in the Middle East, the Assyrians in Turkey still speak Neo Aramaic languages, specifically the Turoyo language. However, some also speak Turkish, and the community in Mardin traditionally speaks Arabic due to historical reasons. Intermarriage between Assyrians and other Christian groups (Armenians and Greeks) is very rare as well.

It was estimated in 2016 that there were 10,000 Syriac Orthodox in Turkey, with most living in Istanbul. The Tur Abdin region is an historical stronghold of Syriac Orthodox Christians. Prior to the 1970s and the Kurdish–Turkish conflict the Tur Abdin region was the epicenter of the Syriac population of Turkey, with 50-70,000 Assyrians being recorded as living there prior to their exodus. As of 2012 2,400 live in Tur Abdin, although it might be around 3-5,000 now due to refugees from Iraq and Syria settling there, and Assyrians from the diaspora gradually returning.

UAE
1. Patriarchal Vicariate of UAE and Arab States of the Persian Gulf under the spiritual guidance and direction of Archbishop Bartholomaus Nathanael Youssef.

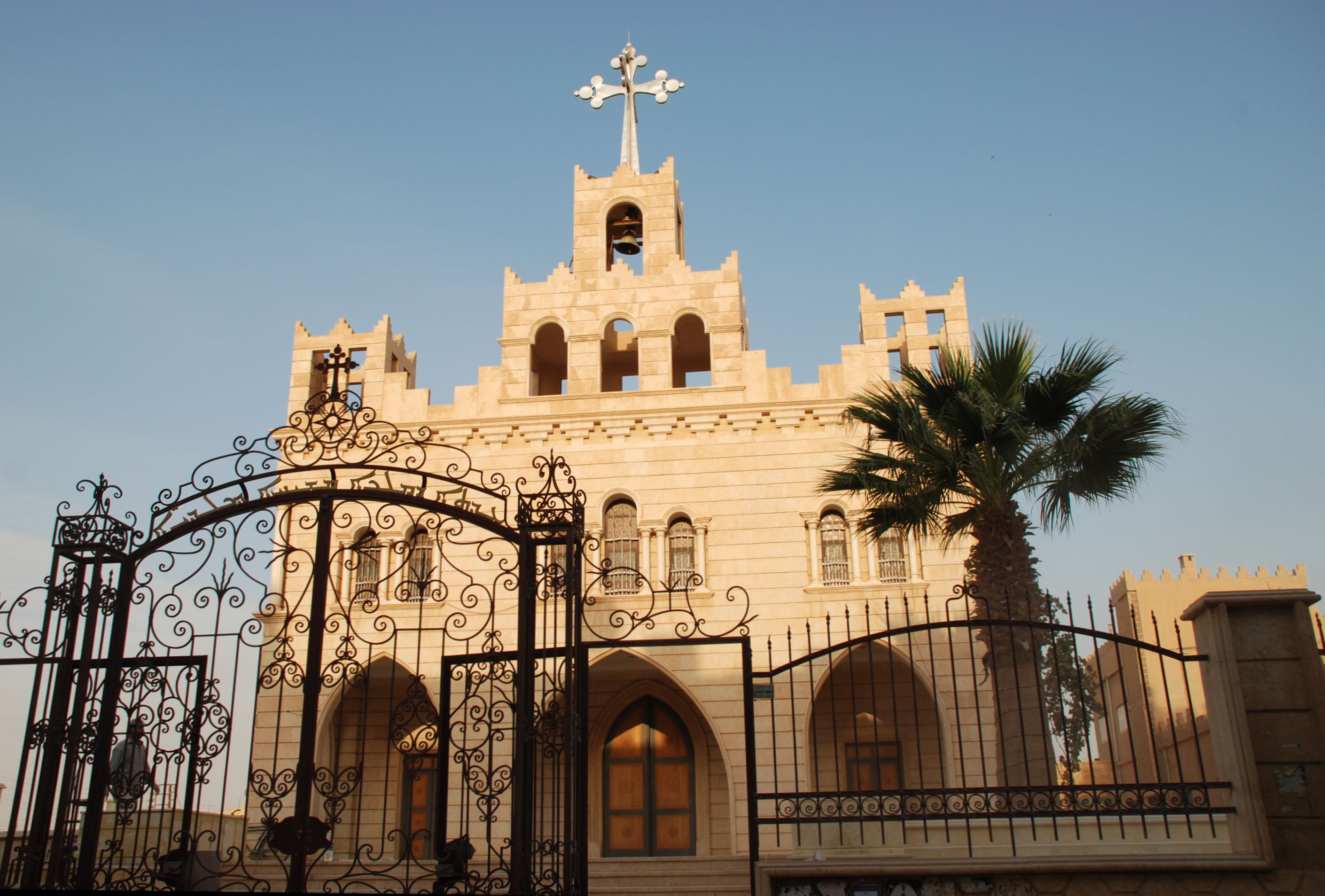
Syrian orthodox church Al-Hasakah

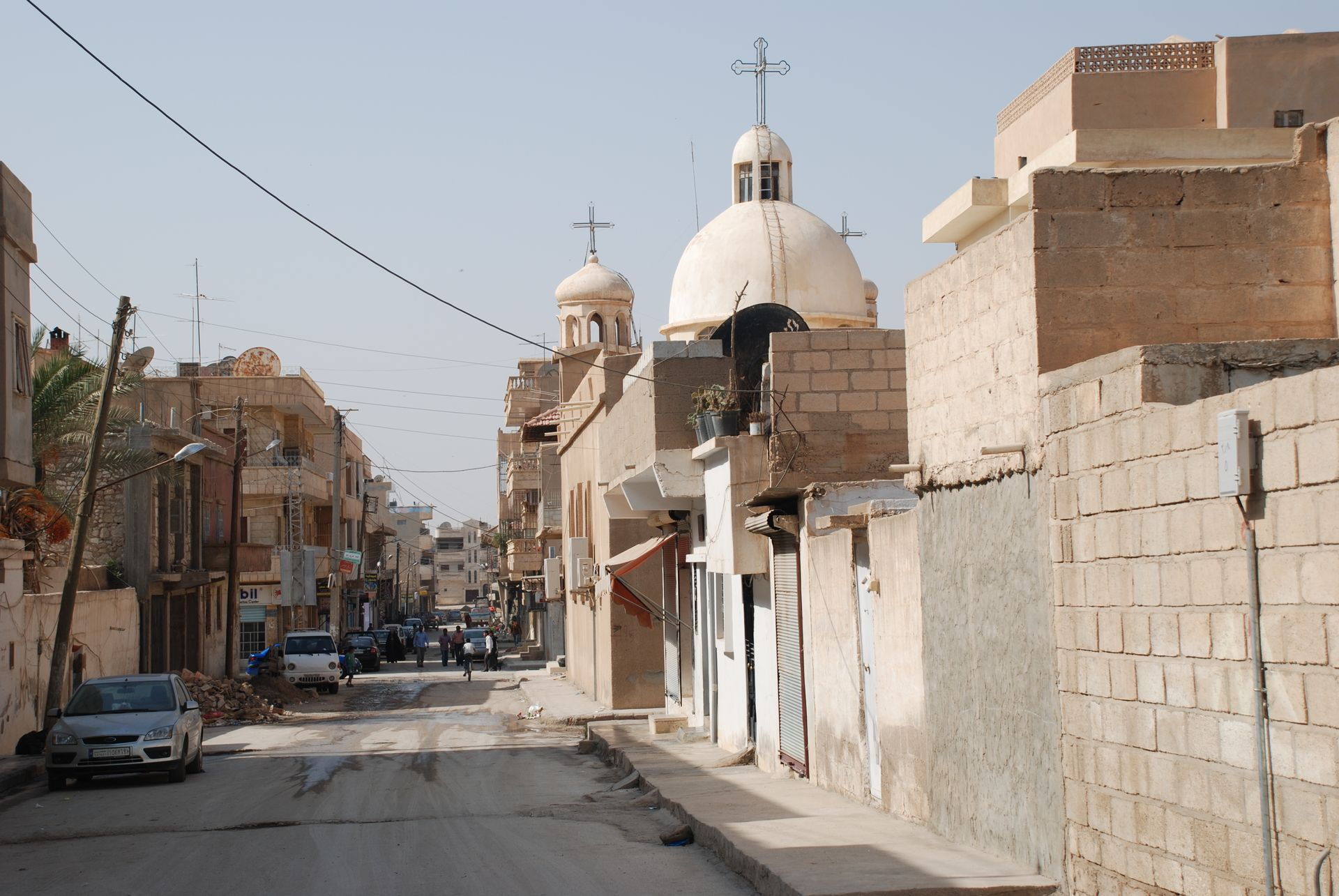
Rasal-Ain Church

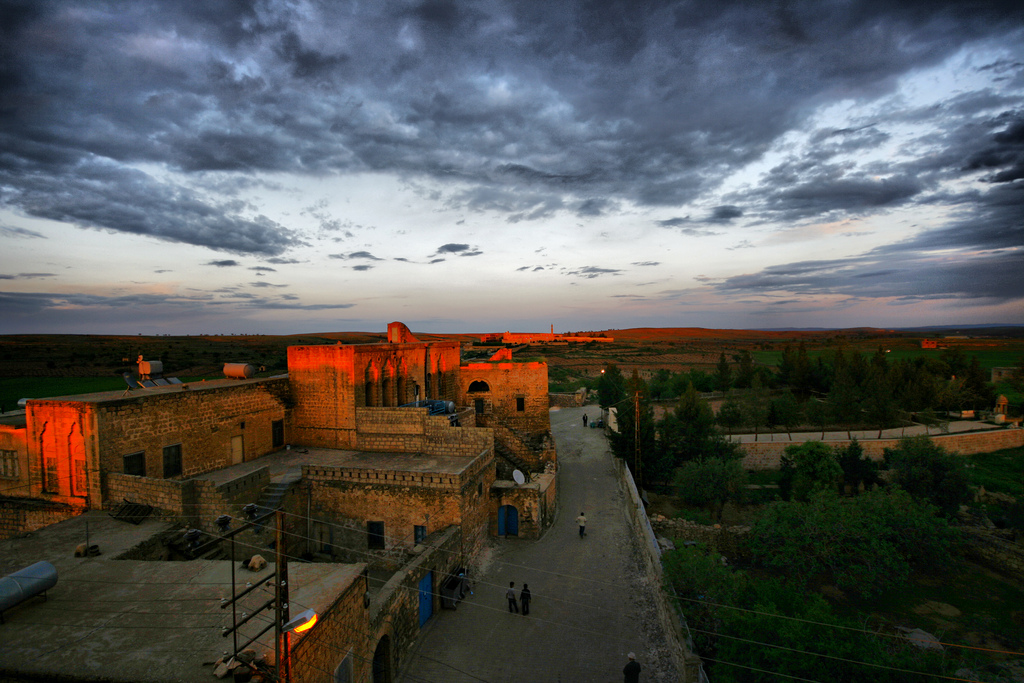
Syriac Orthodox abbey in Mardin

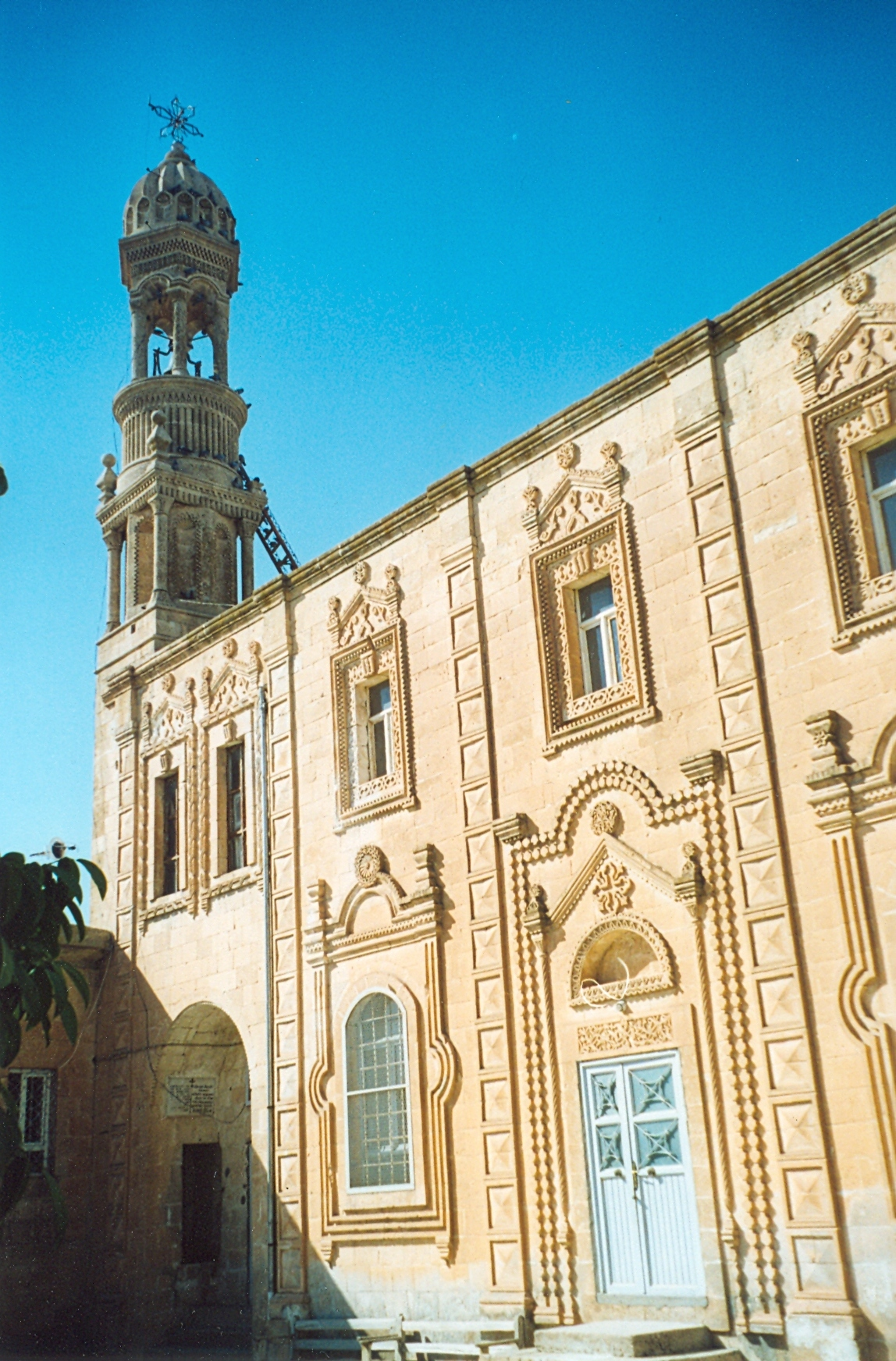
Sharbel Church Midyat

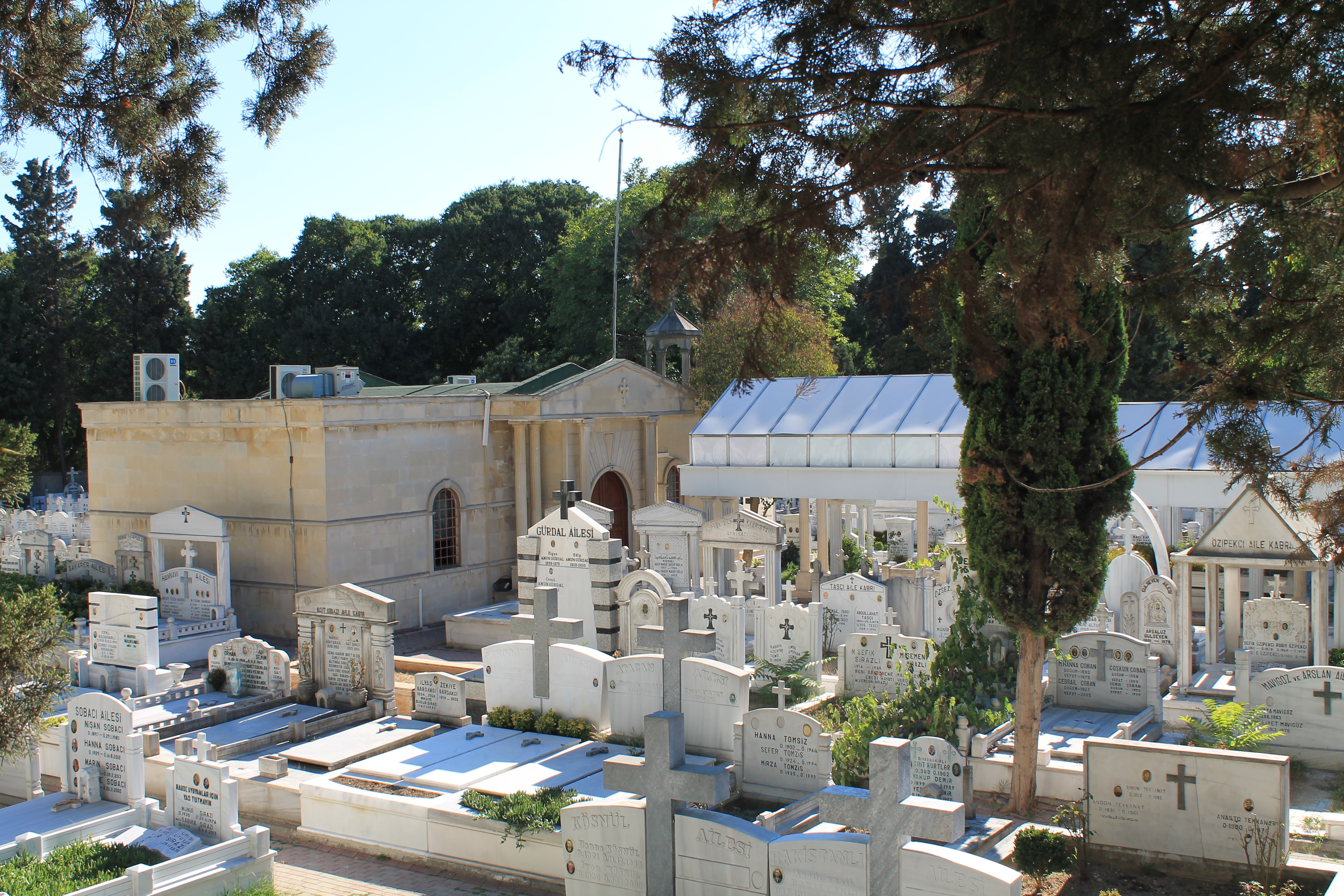
Syriac Orthodox cemetery in Zeytinburnu

India

- Malankara Jacobite Syrian Christian Church

The Jacobite Syrian Christian Church, one of the various Saint Thomas Christian churches in India, is an integral part of the Syriac Orthodox Church, with the Patriarch of Antioch as its supreme head. The head of the church in Malankara (Kerala) is the Catholicos of India who is accountable to the Patriarch of Antioch. Currently the Catholicos of India is Baselios Joseph. The headquarters of the church in India is at Puthencruz, Ernakulam in the state of Kerala in South India. Simhasana Churches and Honavar Mission is under direct control of Patriarch Ignatius Aphrem II.
Unlike most other patriarchal churches abroad, the language of the Syriac Orthodox Divine Liturgy in India is mostly in Malayalam along with Syriac. This is because almost all Syriac Christians in India hail from the State of Kerala, where Malayalam is the native language of the people.
The Indian or Malankara Orthodox Syrian Church, is not affiliated with the Universal Syriac Orthodox Church.

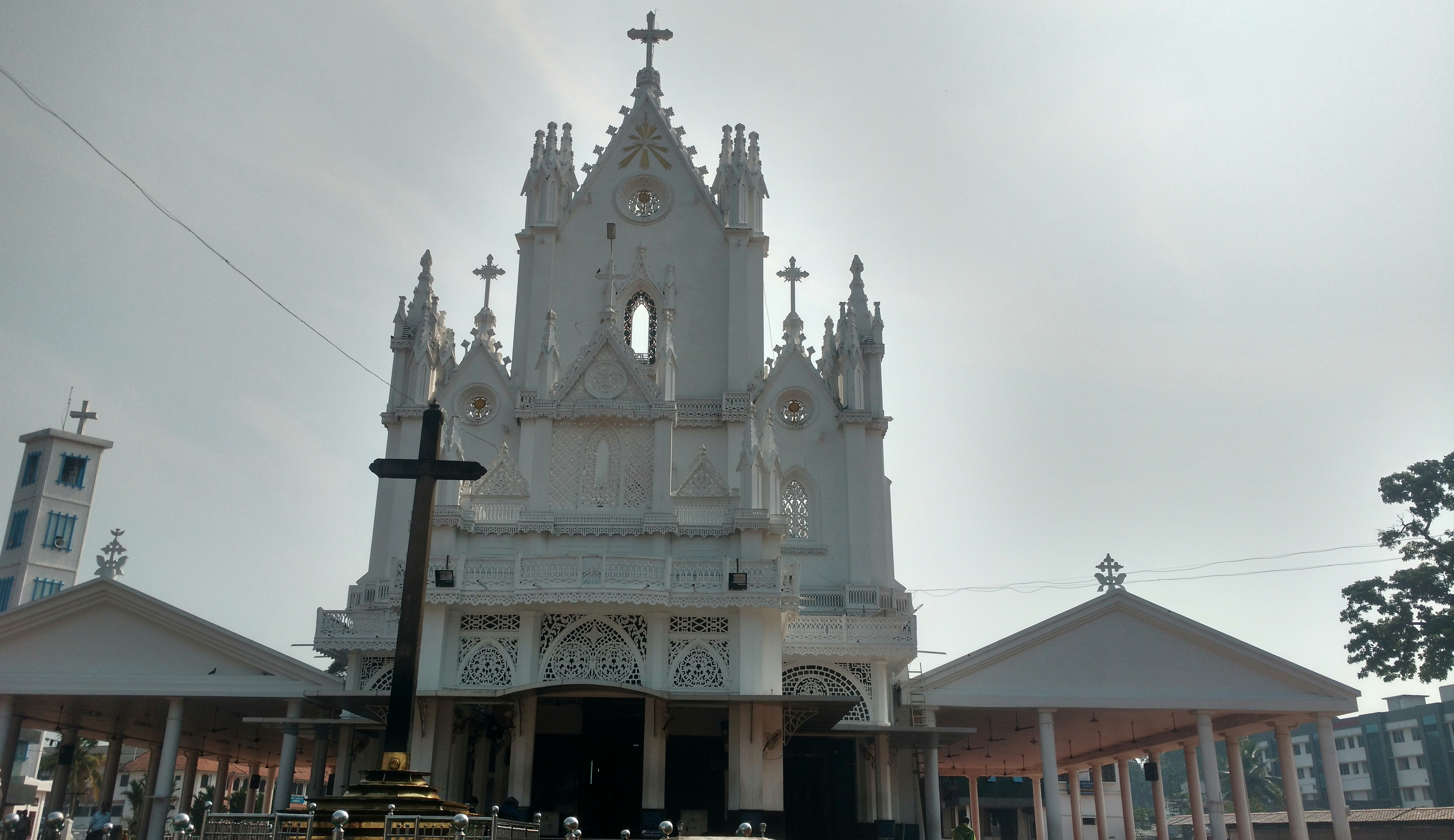
St. Mary's Cathedral, Manarcad

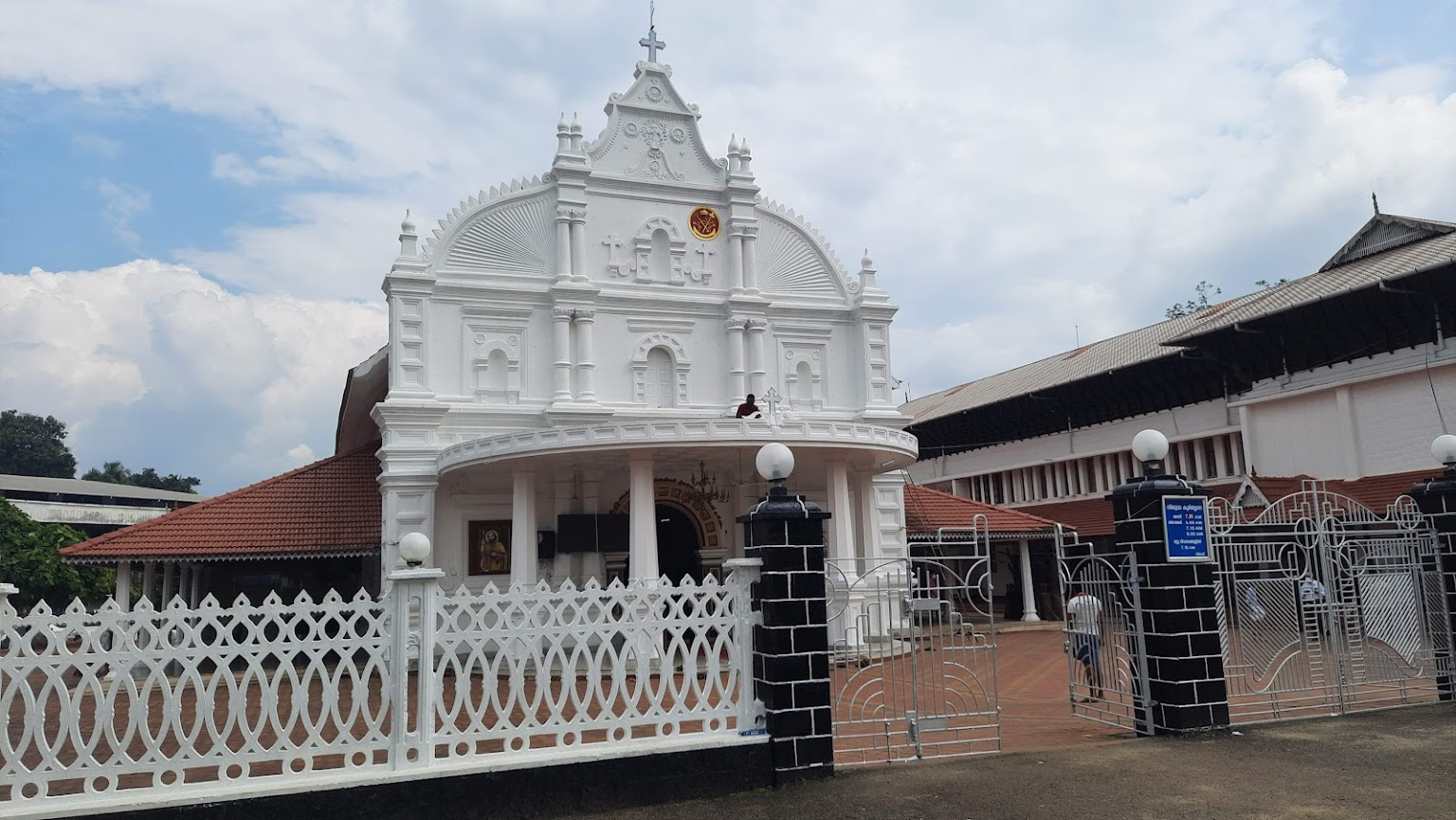
Mar Thoma Cheriapally, Kothamangalam

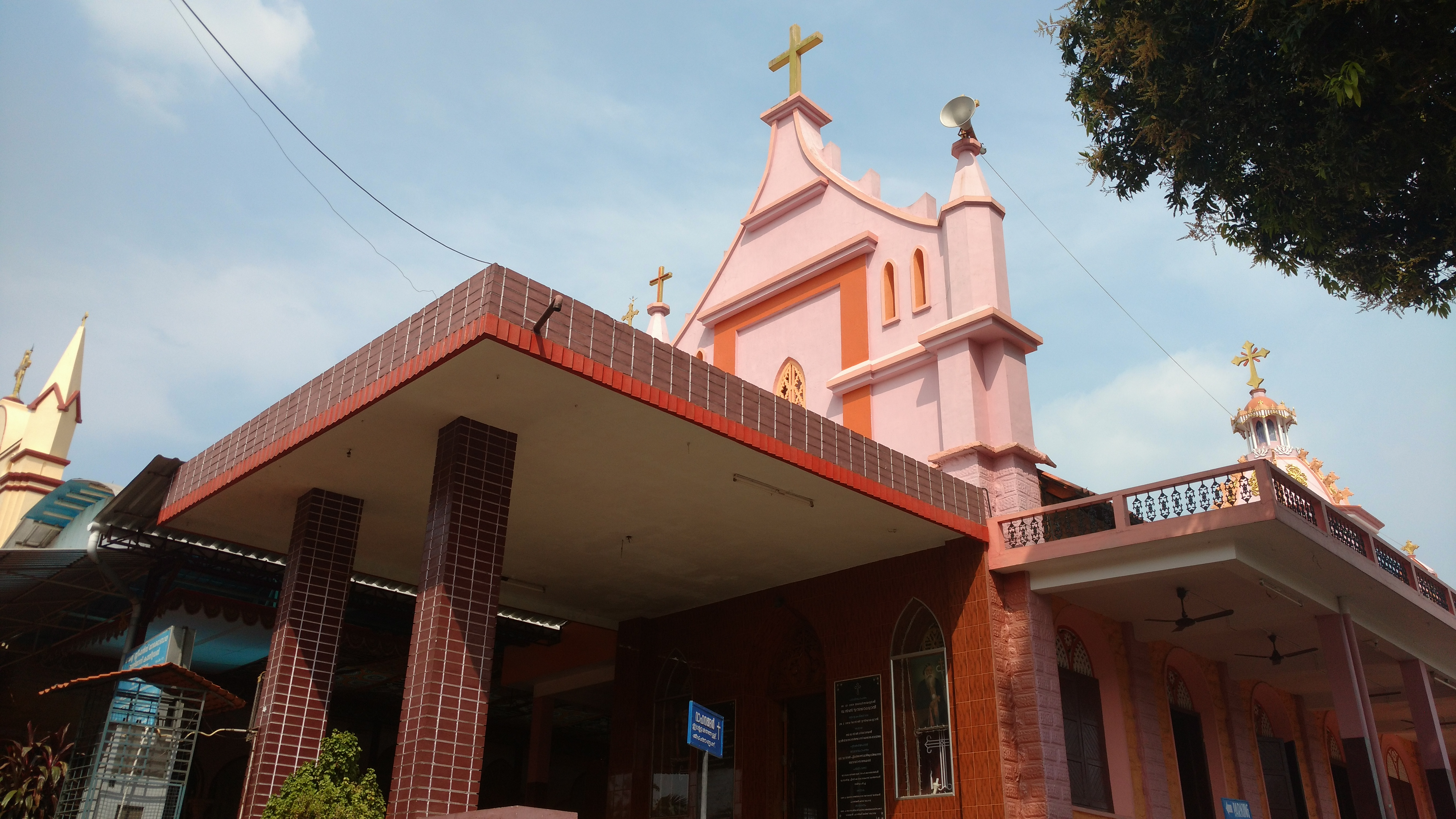
St. Ignatius Monastery, Manjinikkara
- Knanaya Arch Diocese

The Knanaya Syriac Orthodox Church is an archdiocese under the guidance and direction of Archbishop Severious Kuriakose with the patriarch as its spiritual head. They are the followers of the Syrian merchant Knāy Thoma (Thomas of Cana) in the 4th or 8th century, while another legend traces their origin to Jews in the Middle East.

- Evangelistic Association Of The East

E.A.E Arch Diocese is the missionary association of Syriac Orthodox Church founded in 1924 by 'Malphono Naseeho' Geevarghese Athunkal Cor-Episcopa at Perumbavoor. This Arch Diocese is under the direct control of Patriarch under the guidance of Chrysostomos Markose, It is an organization with several Churches, Educational Institutions, Orphanages, Old Age Home, Dayara, Convent, Publications, Mission Centers, Gospel Team, Care Mission, Missionary Training Institute. It is registered in 1949 under Indian Societies Registration Act. XXI of 1860.(Reg. No. S.8/1949ESTD 1924)

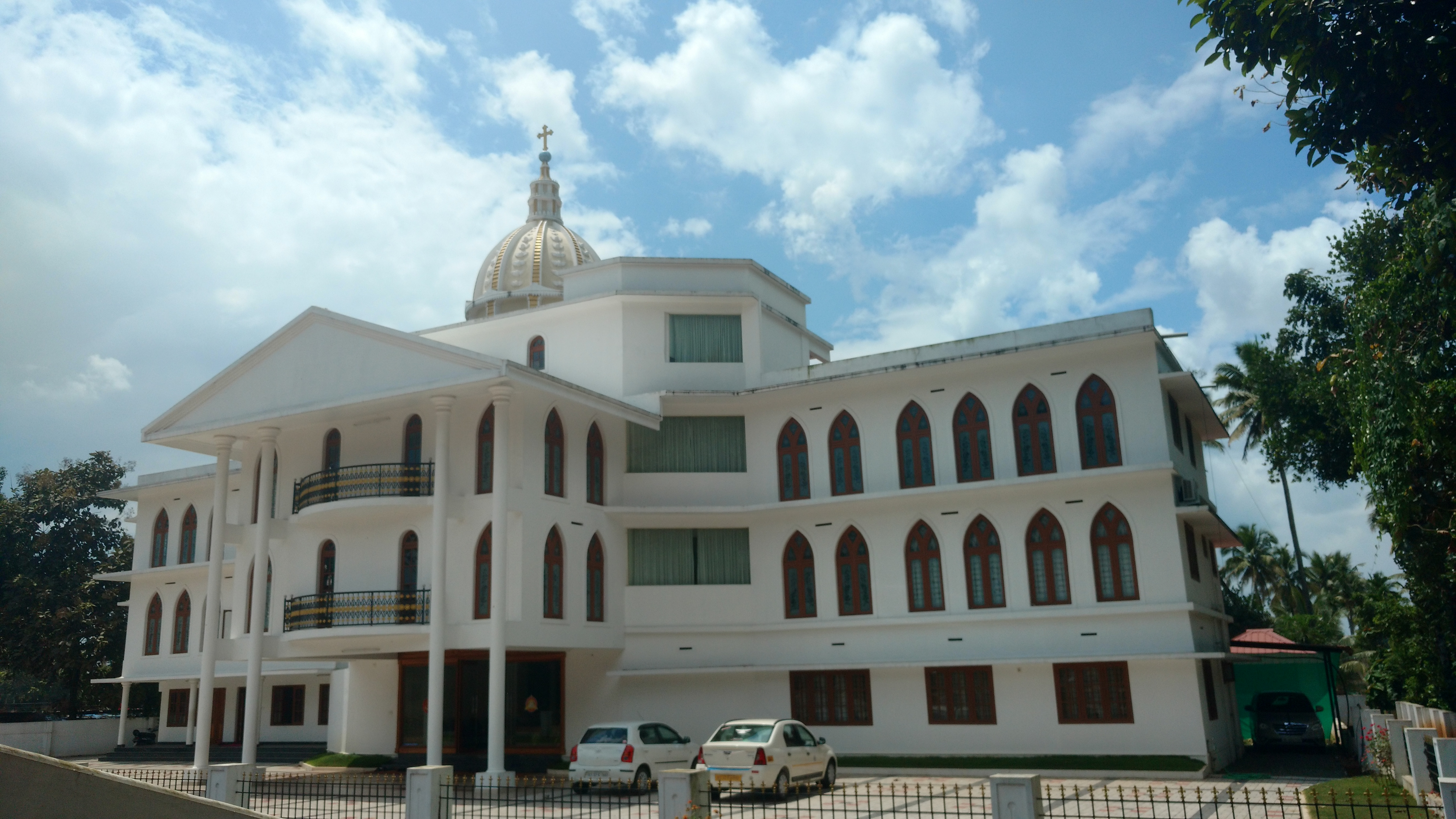
Head Office Of E.A.E

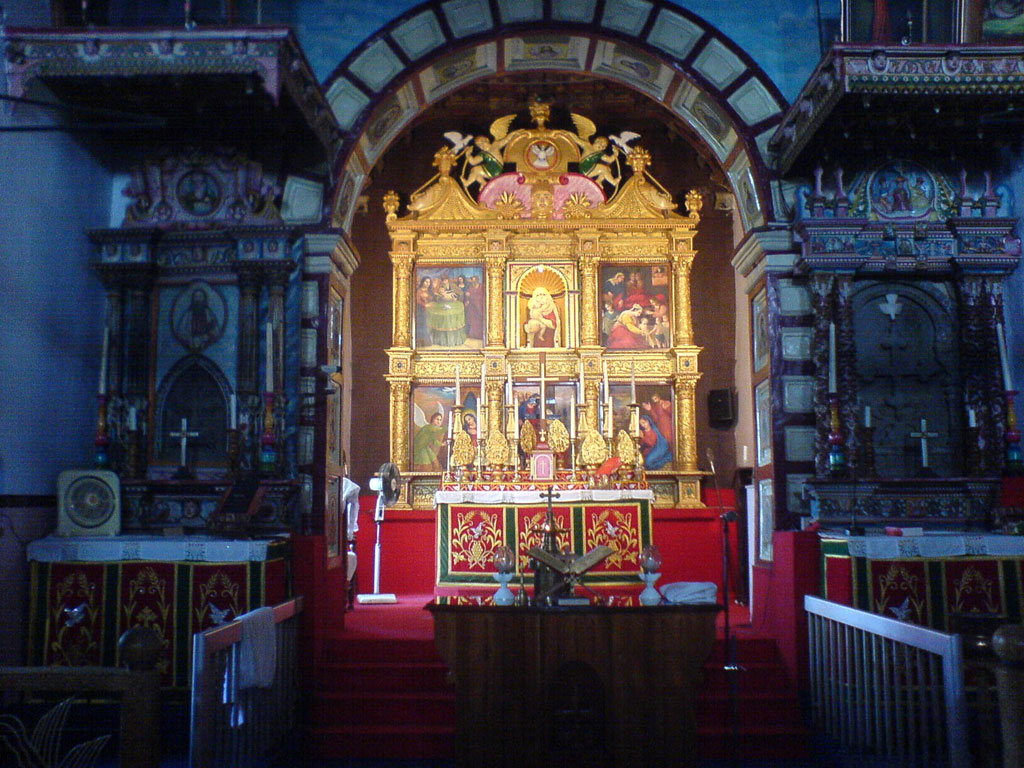
St.Mary's Knanaya Church Kottayam

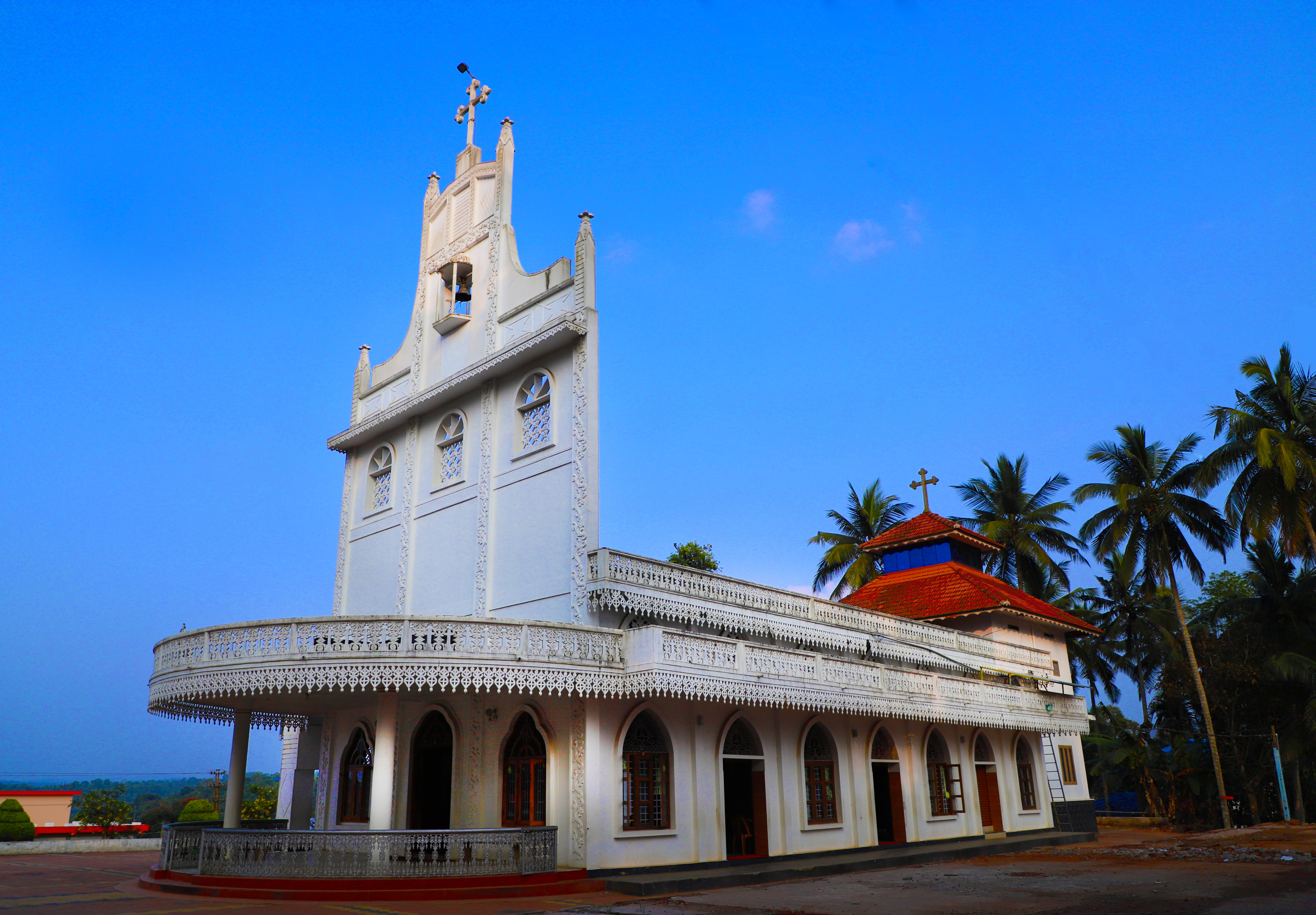
St. Mary's Church Meenangadi
- St Antony's Mission Honnavar

Honnavar Mission is a Christian organization based in Honnavar, Karnataka, India, It is an autonomus body under Syriac Orthodox Patriarchate of Antioch and All the East, established in 1917 by Fr. George Pinto. Initially called "The Order of St. Antony," it was later registered as St. Antony's Educational Society. The mission serves under spiritual guidance of Anthonios Yaqu'b Metropolitan. The mission focuses on the spiritual, educational, and social welfare of the jacobite Christians and Konkani-speaking syrian Christian community in the regions of Mangalore, Brahmavar, Byndoor and Honnavar. It started by establishing schools, orphanages, and hospitals, and later expanded its efforts to serve the growing population of Jacobite Syrian Christians migrating from Kerala to Karnataka.

Under the spiritual leadership of the Patriarch of Antioch and All the East, the mission's ecclesiastical identity was solidified with Fr. Pinto's ordination as Cor Episcopo. The mission played a crucial role in the community’s educational and spiritual development, with significant contributions from leaders like Fr. M.P. George, Very Rev. George Pinto Cor Episcopa and Very Rev C M George Cor-Episcopa.

Today, the mission continues to remains focused on providing education, cultural, and spiritual upliftment to the Jacobite Syrian Christian community in Karnataka. The mission is also involved in preserving its heritage and expanding its influence through various social and educational initiatives.

=== Americas ===
By the end of the 19th century, several communities of Eastern Christians emerged in the United States, as a result of emigration from various regions of the Near East. In English language, Oriental Orthodox Christians of the West Syriac Rite were commonly known as the Jacobites, and that term was used as a denominational designation. In order to achieve legal incorporation under a distinctive name, Jacobite religious communities and associations had to accept the fact that the term Syrian Orthodox Church was already used by communities of the Eastern Orthodox Patriarchate of Antioch in the USA. Since combination of Syrian and Orthodox designations was already taken, Jacobites in the USA opted for alternative solutions, using Apostolic and Assyrian designations. Initial designation (Jacobite Church) was expanded into: Assyrian Jacobite Apostolic Church, and that name was used for legal incorporation of first parishes (1919). By the middle of the 20th century, the term Assyrian was reduced to Syrian, and later modified to Syriac. In 1952, Patriarchal Vicariate for the USA and Canada was created, and in 1995, it was divided in three regional vicariates, for: Eastern America, Western America, and Canada.

North America
Region	Diocese	Metropolitan
United States	Patriarchal Vicariate of the Eastern United States	Archbishop Dionysius Jean Kawak
United States	Patriarchal Vicariate of the Western United States	Archbishop Clemis Eugene Kaplan.
United States	Malankara Archdiocese of North America	Archbishop Titus Yeldho
Canada	Patriarchal Vicariate of Canada	Archbishop Athanasius Elia Bahi
Central America, the Caribbean Islands, and Venezuela
Guatemala	Archdiocese of Central America, the Caribbean Islands and Venezuela	Archbishop Yaqub Eduardo Aguirre Oestmann.
South America
Argentina	Patriarchal Vicariate of Argentina	Archbishop Chrysostomos John Ghassali
Brazil	Patriarchal Vicariate of Brazil	Archbishop Nuncio Theethose Bolous Toza

=== Europe ===
Earlier in 20th century many Syrian Orthodox immigrated to Western Europe diaspora, located in the Sweden, Netherlands, Germany, and Switzerland for economic and political reasons. Dayro d-Mor Ephrem in Netherlands is the first Syriac Orthodox monastery in Europe established in 1981. Dayro d-Mor Awgen, Arth, Switzerland, Dayro d-Mor Ya`qub d-Sarug, Warburg, Germany are the other monasteries located in Europe.

Europe
Region	Diocese	Metropolitan
Belgium	Patriarchal Vicariate of Belgium, France and Luxembourg	Archbishop George Kourieh
Germany	Patriarchal Vicariate of Germany	Archbishop Philoxenus Mattias Nayis
Germany	Ecumenical Movement in Germany	Archbishop Julius Hanna Aydın
Netherlands	Patriarchal Vicariate of the Netherlands	Archbishop Polycarpus Augin (Eugene) Aydın
Spain	Patriarchal Vicariate of Spain	Archbishop Nicolaos Matti Abd Alahad
Sweden	Archbishopric of Sweden and Scandinavia	Archbishop Yuhanon Lahdo
Sweden	Patriarchal Vicariate of Sweden	Archbishop Dioskoros Benyamen Atas
Switzerland	Patriarchal Vicariate of Switzerland and Austria	Archbishop Dionysius Isa Gürbüz
United Kingdom	Patriarchal Vicariate of United Kingdom	Archbishop Athanasius Toma Dawod

Gallery

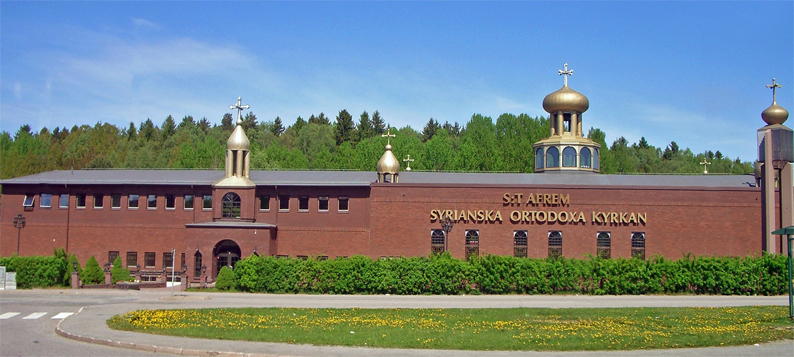
Saint Afram Syriac Orthodox Cathedral

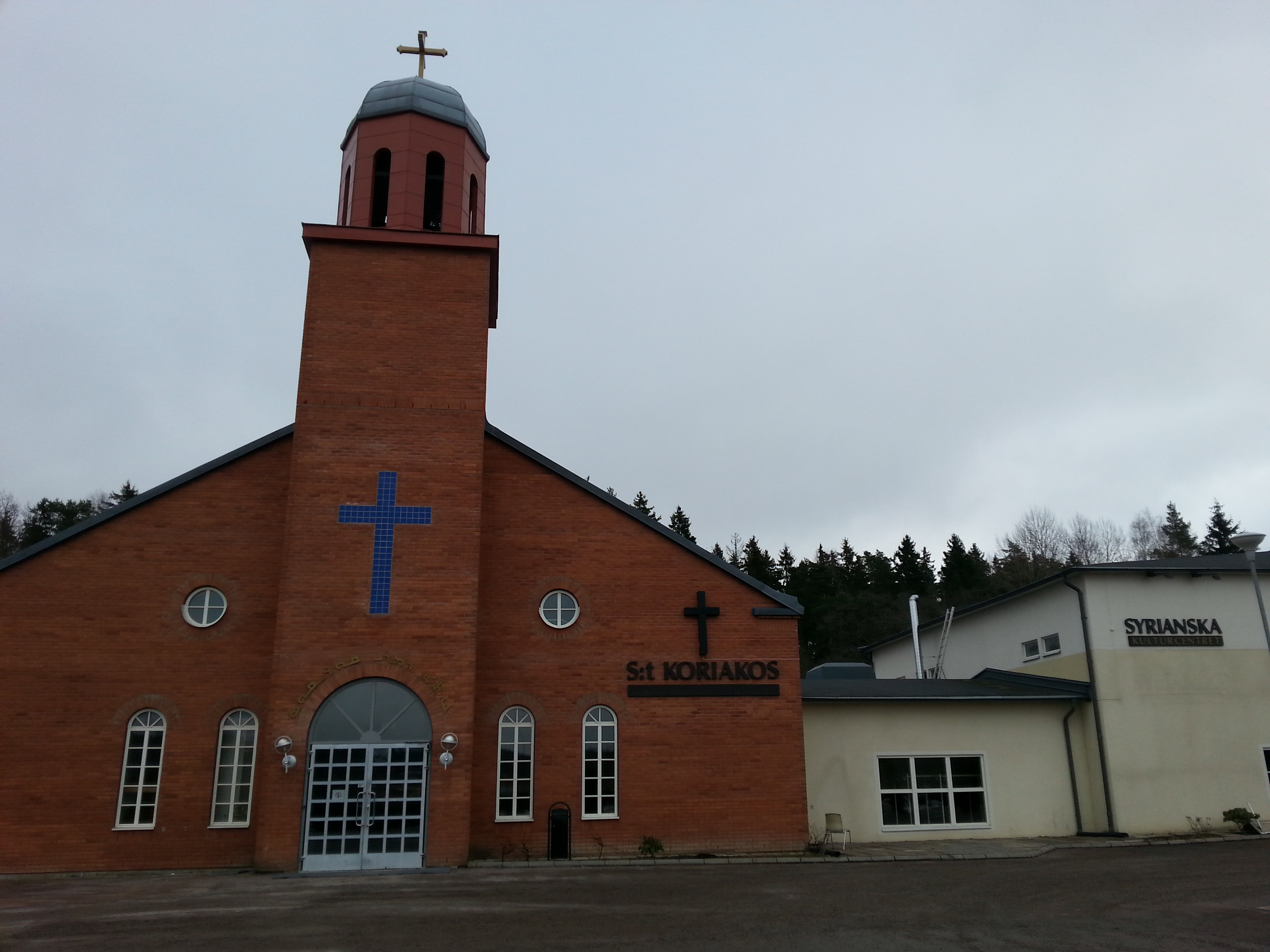
St.Kuriakose Church, Vallby, Västerås

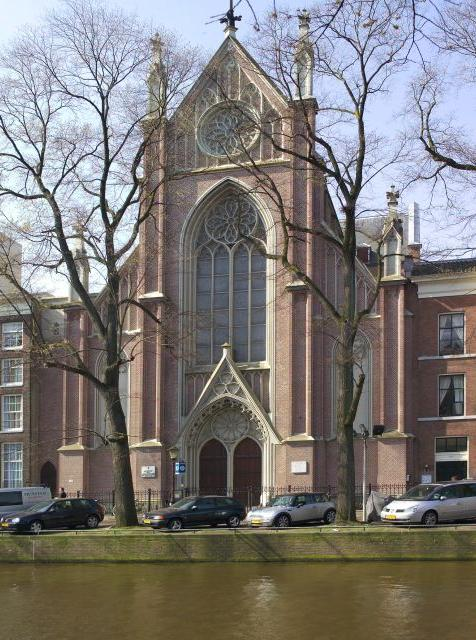
Church of Our Lady, Amsterdam

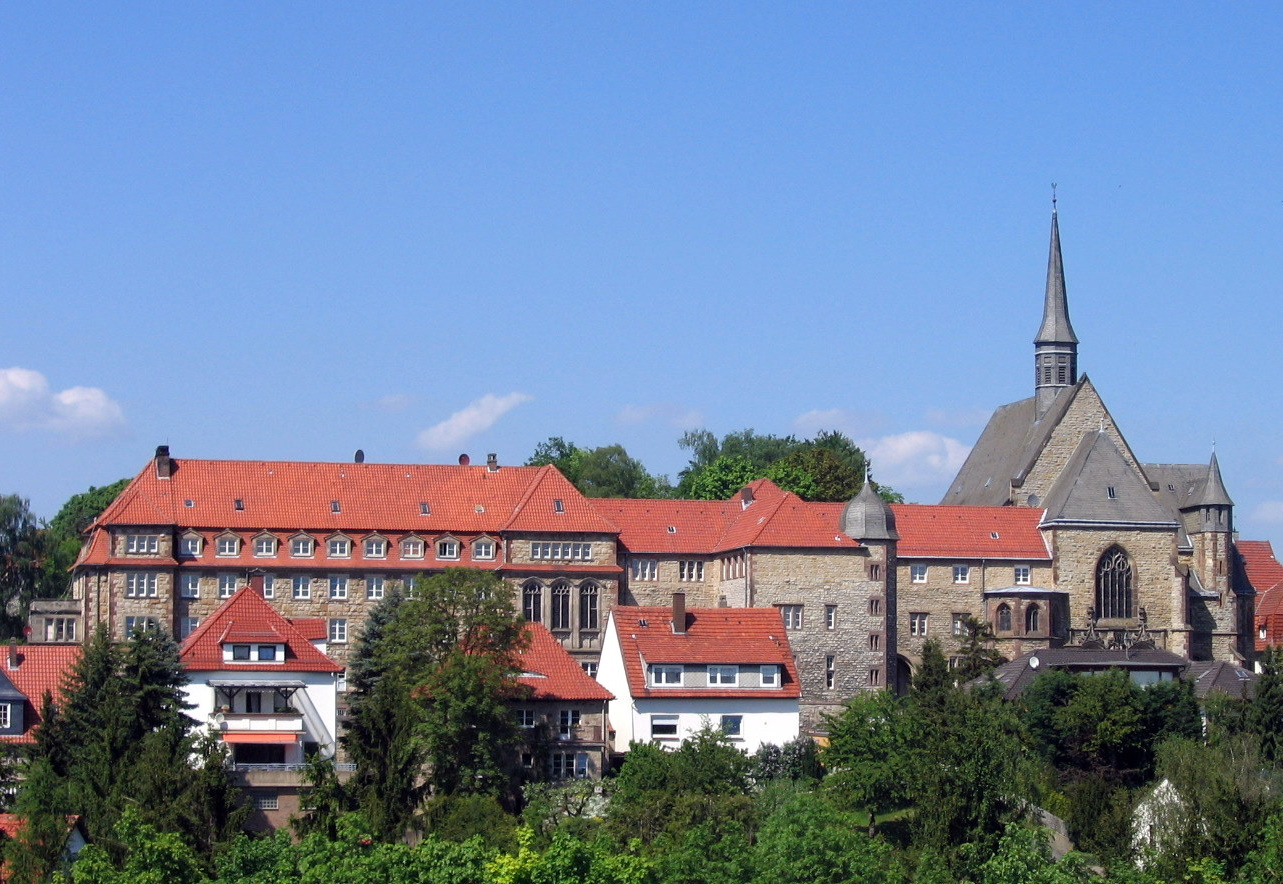
Monastery of Mor Ya`qub of Sarug in Warburg

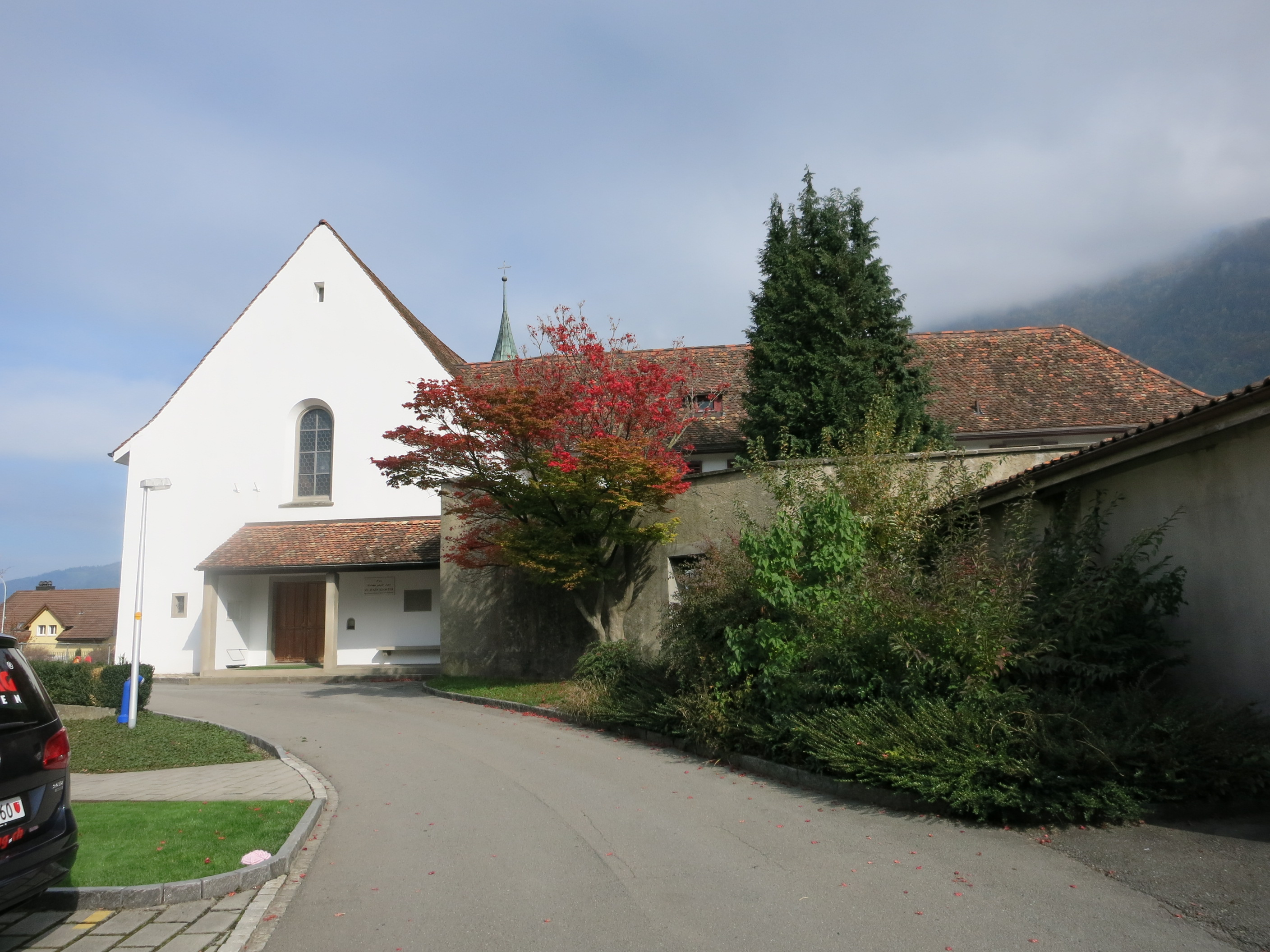
St.Avgin Monastery, Arth, Switzerland

=== Oceania ===
Australia and New Zealand

- Patriarchal Vicariate of Australia and New Zealand under Archbishop Malatius Malki Malki
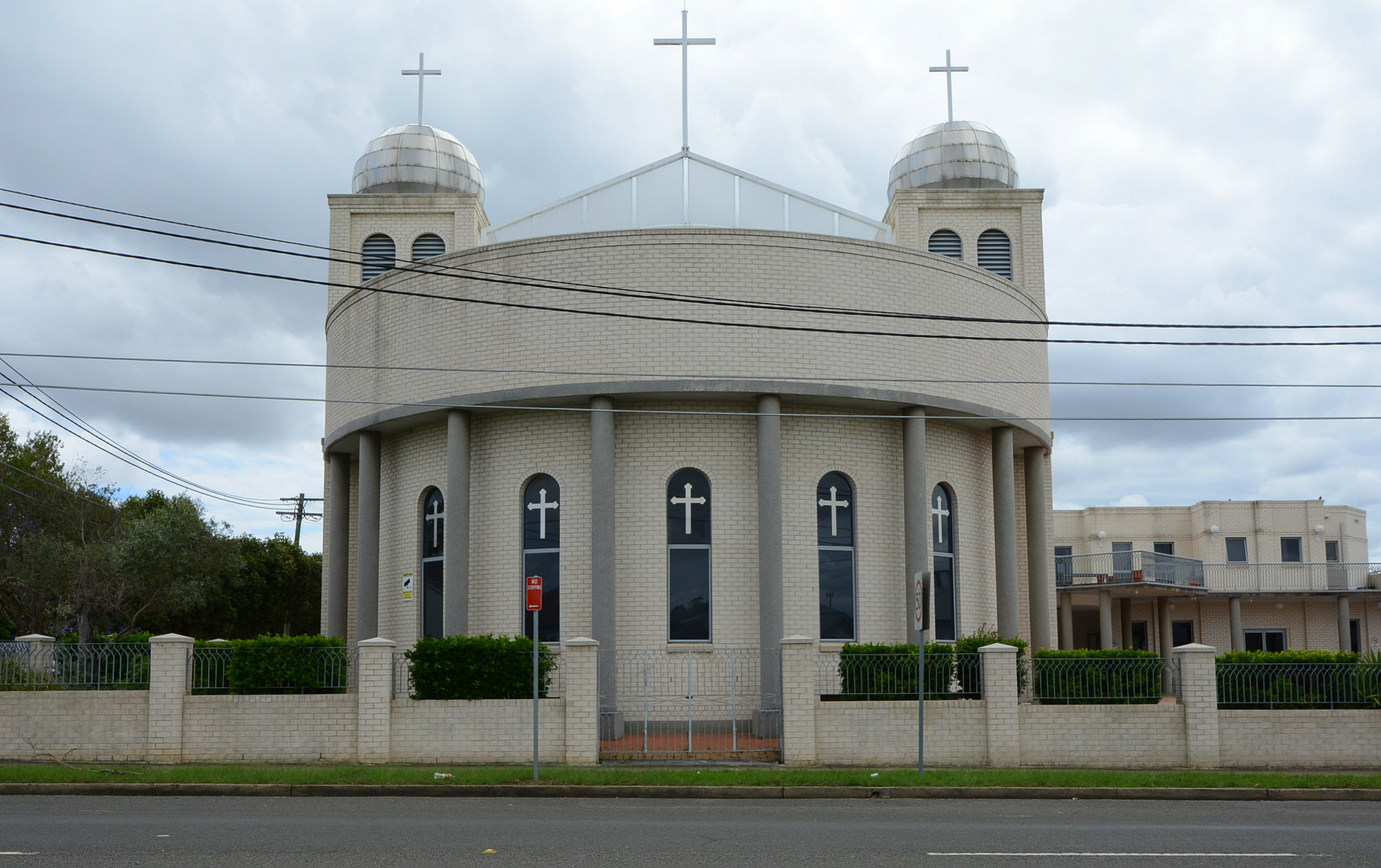
St. Ephraim Cathedral, Lidcombe

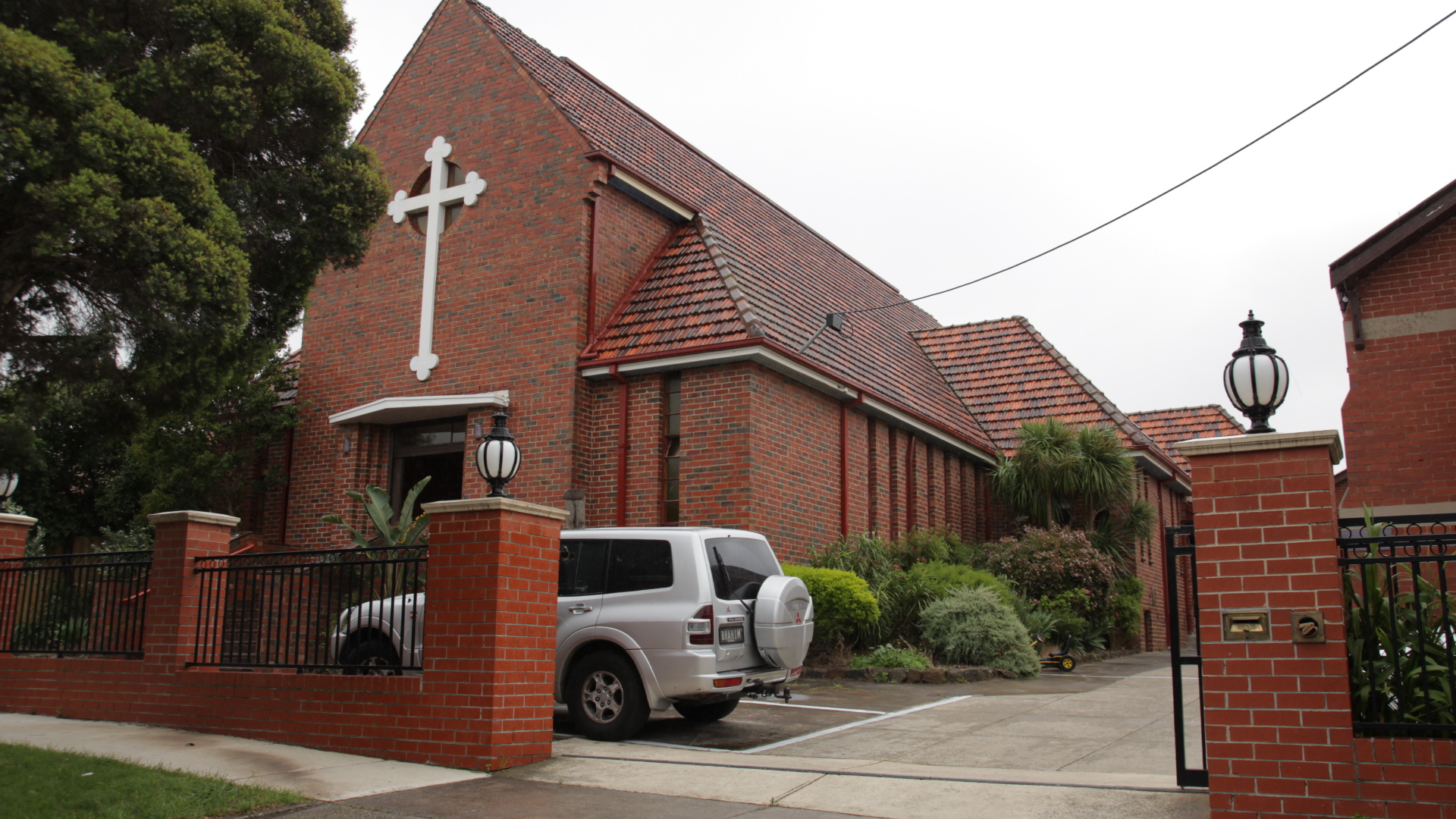
St Aphrem Syrian Orthodox Church, Victoria

== See also ==
- Dioceses of the Church of the East

== Sources ==
- Abbeloos, Jean Baptiste; Lamy, Thomas Joseph, eds. (1877). Bar Hebraeus, Chronicon Ecclesiasticum (3 vols). Paris.
- Bardakci, M.; Freyberg-Inan, A.; Giesel, C.; Leisse, O. (2017). Religious Minorities in Turkey: Alevi, Armenians, and Syriacs and the Struggle to Desecuritize Religious Freedom. Palgrave Macmillan UK. ISBN 978-1-137-27026-9.
- Donabed, Sargon G.; Donabed, Ninos (2006). Assyrians of Eastern Massachusetts. Charleston: Arcadia Publishing. ISBN 9780738544809.
- Donabed, Sargon G.; Mako, Shamiran (2009). "Ethno-cultural and Religious Identity of Syrian Orthodox Christians" (PDF). Chronos: Revue d'Histoire de l'Université de Balamand. 19: 69–111.
- Donabed, Sargon G. (2015). Reforging a Forgotten History: Iraq and the Assyrians in the Twentieth Century. Edinburgh: Edinburgh University Press. ISBN 9780748686056.
- Fiey, Jean Maurice (1979) [1963]. Communautés syriaques en Iran et Irak des origines à 1552. London: Variorum Reprints. ISBN 9780860780519.
- Fiey, Jean Maurice (1993). Pour un Oriens Christianus Novus: Répertoire des diocèses syriaques orientaux et occidentaux. Beirut: Orient-Institut. ISBN 9783515057189.
- Haar Romeny, Bas ter (2005). "From Religious Association to Ethnic Community: A Research Project on Identity Formation among the Syrian Orthodox under Muslim Rule". Islam and Christian–Muslim Relations. 16 (4): 377–399. doi:10.1080/09596410500250248. S2CID 146155860.
- Haar Romeny, Bas ter (2012). "Ethnicity, Ethnogenesis and the Identity of Syriac Orthodox Christians". Visions of Community in the Post-Roman World: The West, Byzantium and the Islamic World, 300-1100. Farnham: Ashgate Publishing. pp. 183–204. ISBN 9781317001362.
- Hunter, Erica C. D. (2014). "The Syrian Orthodox Church". In Leustean, Lucian N. (ed.). Eastern Christianity and Politics in the Twenty-First Century. Routledge. pp. 541–562. ISBN 978-1-317-81866-3.
- Jongerden, Joost; Verheij, Jelle (2012). Social Relations in Ottoman Diyarbekir, 1870–1915. BRILL. pp. 222–. ISBN 978-90-04-22518-3.
- Joseph, John (1983). Muslim-Christian Relations and Inter-Christian Rivalries in the Middle East: The Case of the Jacobites in an Age of Transition. SUNY Press. ISBN 978-0-87395-600-0.
- Kiraz, George A. (2019). The Syriac Orthodox in North America (1895–1995): A Short History. Piscataway, NJ: Gorgias Press. ISBN 9781463240370.
- Kiraz, George A. (2020). "Negotiating Identity with the Homeland: The Syriac Orthodox of North America in the Early Twentieth Century". From Polarization to Cohabitation in the New Middle East. Wiesbaden: Harrassowitz Verlag. pp. 77–94. ISBN 9783447114561.
- Parry, Ken (2010). The Blackwell Companion to Eastern Christianity. John Wiley & Sons. ISBN 978-1-4443-3361-9.
- Sharma, Suresh K.; Sharma, Usha (2004). Cultural and Religious Heritage of India: Christianity. Mittal Publications. ISBN 978-81-7099-959-1.
- Swiderski, Richard Michael (1988). "Northists and Southists: A Folklore of Kerala Christians". Asian Folklore Studies. 47 (1). Nanzan University: 73–92. doi:10.2307/1178253. JSTOR 1178253.
- Tozman, Markus K.; Tyndall, Andrea (2012). The Slow Disappearance of the Syriacs from Turkey and of the Grounds of the Mor Gabriel Monastery. LIT Verlag Münster. ISBN 978-3-643-90268-9.
- Whitehouse, T. (1873). Lingerings of light in a dark land: researches into the Syrian church of Malabar.
