= Qlaudia (West Syriac diocese) =

Syriac Orthodox Church diocese in Turkey

Qlaudia (or Claudia) was a diocese in the Syriac Orthodox metropolitan province of Melitene (Malatya), attested between the tenth and thirteenth centuries. Sixteen Jacobite bishops of Qlaudia are mentioned either by Michael the Syrian or Bar Hebraeus. By 1283, as a result of several decades of warfare and brigandage, the diocese of Qlaudia was ruined. The diocese is not again mentioned, and seems to have lapsed around the end of the thirteenth century.

== Sources ==
The main primary source for the Syriac Orthodox bishops of Qlaudia is the record of episcopal consecrations appended to Volume III of the Chronicle of the Syriac Orthodox patriarch Michael the Syrian (1166–99). In this Appendix Michael listed most of the bishops consecrated by the Syriac Orthodox patriarchs of Antioch between the ninth and twelfth centuries. Twenty-eight Syriac Orthodox patriarchs sat during this period, and in many cases Michael was able to list the names of the bishops consecrated during their reigns, their monasteries of origin, and the place where they were consecrated. For the thirteenth century, Michael's lists are supplemented by several references in the Chronicon Syriacum and Chronicon Ecclesiasticum of the Syriac Orthodox maphrian Bar Hebraeus (ob.1286).

== Location ==
Qlaudia was a district near Melitene (modern Malatya), in eastern Turkey.

== Bishops of Qlaudia ==
Fourteen bishops of Qlaudia are mentioned in the lists of Michael the Syrian.

Name	From	Consecrated in the reign of	Place of consecration
Peter	not known	Yohannan V (936–53)	not known
Michael	Monastery of Mar Bar Sawma, Melitene	Yohannan VI Sarigta (965–86)	not known
Mushe	not known	Yohannan VI Sarigta (965–86)	Germanicia (Marʿash)
Dionysius	not known	Athanasius IV Laʿzar (987–1003)	not known
Thomas	Monastery of Nahra d'Qarire	Yohannan VII bar ʿAbdon (1004–30)	not known
Basil	Monastery of Mar Bar Sawma, Melitene	Yohannan VII bar ʿAbdon (1004–30)	not known
Peter	Monastery of Hur ʿEbar	Yohannan bar ʿAbdon (1042–57)	not known
Timothy	Monastery of Qarqafta	Yohannan VIII bar Shushan (1063–73)	not known
Gregory	Monastery of Mar Bar Sawma, Melitene	Athanasius VI bar Khamara (1091–1129)	not known
Timothy	not known	Athanasius VI bar Khamara (1091–1129)	Monastery of Mar Bar Sawma, Melitene
Basil	Monastery of Modiq	Athanasius VII bar Qutreh (1139–66)	not known
Timothy (1)	Monastery of Modiq	Michael I (1166–99)	not known
Timothy (2)	Monastery of Modiq	Michael I (1166–99)	not known
Gregory	Monastery of Modiq	Michael I (1166–99)	not known

The bishop Dionysius of Qlaudia is mentioned in several sources for the middle decades of the thirteenth century.

In 1283, according to Bar Hebraeus, the diocese of Qlaudia and the other suffragan dioceses of the province of Melitene were ruined:

Even if I wanted to be patriarch, as many others do, what is there to covet in the appointment, since so many dioceses of the East have been devastated? Should I set my heart on Antioch, where sighs and groans will meet me? Or the holy diocese of Gumal, where nobody is left to piss against a wall? Or Aleppo, or Mabbugh, or Callinicus, or Edessa, or Harran, all deserted? Or Laqabin, ʿArqa, Qlisura, Semha, Gubos, Qlaudia and Gargar—the seven dioceses around Melitene—where not a soul remains?

Despite the gloomy testimony of Bar Hebraeus, there is evidence that the diocese of Qlaudia continued to exist at this period. According to the colophon of a contemporary manuscript, the metropolitan Ignatius of Qlaudia, which is Qust', was among the fifteen bishops consecrated by the patriarch Philoxenus Nemrud (1283–92).

The diocese of Qlaudia is not mentioned in any later source, and probably lapsed around the end of the thirteenth century.
