= Qlisura (West Syriac diocese) =

Syriac Orthodox Church diocese in Turkey

Qlisura (or Qalisura, Callisura, from kleisoura) was a diocese in the Syriac Orthodox metropolitan province of Melitene (modern Malatya), attested between the ninth and thirteenth centuries. Eighteen Jacobite bishops of Qlisura are mentioned in the histories of Michael the Syrian and Bar Hebraeus, and in other West Syriac sources. By 1283, as a result of several decades of warfare and brigandage, the diocese of Qlisura was ruined, though it apparently still had a bishop several years later. The diocese is not again mentioned, and seems to have lapsed around the end of the thirteenth century.

== Sources ==
The main primary source for the Syriac Orthodox bishops of Qlisura is the record of episcopal consecrations appended to Volume III of the Chronicle of the Syriac Orthodox patriarch Michael the Syrian (1166–99). In this Appendix Michael listed most of the bishops consecrated by the Syriac Orthodox patriarchs of Antioch between the ninth and twelfth centuries. Twenty-eight Syriac Orthodox patriarchs sat during this period, and in many cases Michael was able to list the names of the bishops consecrated during their reigns, their monasteries of origin, and the place where they were consecrated. For the thirteenth century, Michael's lists are supplemented by several references in the Chronicon Syriacum and Chronicon Ecclesiasticum of the Syriac Orthodox maphrian Bar Hebraeus (ob.1286).

== Location ==
Qlisura was a small town near Melitene (modern Malatya), in eastern Turkey.

== Bishops of Qlisura ==
Seventeen bishops of Qlisura are mentioned in the lists of Michael the Syrian.

Name	From	Consecrated in the reign of	Place of consecration
Hnanya	Monastery of Natfa	Dionysius I of Tel Mahre (818–45)	not known
Iwanis	Monastery of Saphylos, Rishʿaina	Yohannan III (847–74)	not known
Stephen	Monastery of Mar Yohannan, Germanicia (Marʿash)	Yohannan III (847–74)	not known
Denha	Monastery of Mar Shila	Theodosius Romanus (887–95)	not known
Job	Monastery of Qartmin, Tur ʿAbdin	Dionysius II (896–909)	not known
Severus	Monastery of Mar Yaʿqob of Kaishum	Yohannan IV (910–22)	not known
Athanasius	not known	Yohannan VI Sarigta (965–86)	not known
Michael	Monastery of Mar Yohannan, Germanicia (Marʿash)	Yohannan VI Sarigta (965–86)	Monastery of Mar Bar Sawma, Melitene
Isaac	Monastery of Sergisyeh, Melitene	Athanasius IV Laʿzar (987–1003)	not known
Abraham	Monastery of Sergisyeh, Melitene	Yohannan VII Bar ʿAbdon (1004–30)	not known
Timothy	Monastery of Mar Ahron, Shigar	Dionysius IV Heheh (1032–42)	not known
Iwanis	Monastery of Tel Patriq, Melitene	Yohannan bar ʿAbdon (1042–57)	not known
Timothy	Mor Bar Sauma Monastery, Melitene	Iwanis III (1086–7)	not known
Iwanis	Monastery of Modiq, Melitene	Athanasius VI bar Khamara (1091–1129)	not known
Iwanis	Melitene	Athanasius VII bar Qutreh (1139–66)	Monastery of Mar Bar Sawma, Melitene
Iwanis bar Qanun	not known	Michael I (1166–99)	not known
Basil	'the monastery which is in the Blessed Mountain'	Michael I (1166–99)	not known

Further details of some of these bishops are supplied in the narrative sections of the Chronicle of Michael the Syrian and in the Chronicon Ecclesiasticum of Bar Hebraeus:

- Abraham (1004/1030) consecrated the patriarch Dionysius IV Heheh in 1032 (or, according to Bar Hebraeus, 1034).
- Iwanis (1042/1057) is separately attested in 1054.
- Iwanis (1139/1166) is known to have been flogged by the Turks of Hanzit in 1141, and was present at the consecration of the patriarch Michael the Syrian in 1166, when his name was recorded as Yohannan.
- Iwanis bar Qanun (1166/1199) was present at the synod of Modiq in 1222 which met to elect the patriarch Ignatius III David (1222–52).

In 1283, according to Bar Hebraeus, the diocese of Qlisura and the other suffragan dioceses of the province of Melitene were ruined:

Even if I wanted to be patriarch, as many others do, what is there to covet in the appointment, since so many dioceses of the East have been devastated? Should I set my heart on Antioch, where sighs and groans will meet me? Or the holy diocese of Gumal, where nobody is left to piss against a wall? Or Aleppo, or Mabbugh, or Callinicus, or Edessa, or Harran, all deserted? Or Laqabin, ʿArqa, Qlisura, Semha, Gubos, Qlaudia and Gargar—the seven dioceses around Melitene—where not a soul remains?

Despite the gloomy testimony of Bar Hebraeus, there is evidence that the diocese of Qlisura continued to exist at this period. According to the colophon of a contemporary manuscript, the bishop Dioscorus of Qlisura, from the monastery of Mar Ahron near the city of Shigar, was among the fifteen bishops consecrated by the patriarch Philoxenus Nemrud (1283–92).

The diocese of Qlisura is not mentioned in any later source, and probably lapsed around the end of the thirteenth century.
