= Laqabin =

Syriac Orthodox Church diocese in Syria

Laqabin was a diocese of the Syriac Orthodox Church, suffragan of the archdiocese of Melitene. The diocese, also known as Qarna and Tella d'Arsenias, is attested between the tenth and thirteenth centuries. Twenty-three bishops of Laqabin are mentioned in the histories of Michael the Syrian and Bar Hebraeus and in other Syriac Orthodox sources. The last-known bishop of Laqabin, Timothy, was consecrated by the patriarch Philoxenus Nemrud (1283–92), and the diocese seems to have lapsed in the early decades of the fourteenth century.

== Sources ==
The main primary source for the Syriac Orthodox bishops of Laqabin is the record of episcopal consecrations appended to Volume III of the Chronicle of the Syriac Orthodox patriarch Michael the Syrian (1166–99). In this Appendix Michael listed most of the bishops consecrated by the Syriac Orthodox patriarchs of Antioch between the ninth and twelfth centuries. Twenty-eight Syriac Orthodox patriarchs sat during this period, and in many cases Michael was able to list the names of the bishops consecrated during their reigns, their monasteries of origin, and the place where they were consecrated. For the thirteenth century, Michael's lists are supplemented by several references in the Chronicon Syriacum and Chronicon Ecclesiasticum of the Jacobite maphrian Bar Hebraeus (ob.1286).

== Nomenclature ==
The Syriac Orthodox diocese of Laqabin was also known as Qarna and Tella d’Arsenias. The diocese was usually styled Qarna in the tenth century. In the first half of the eleventh century, its bishops bore various titles: Tella d’Arsenias, Qarna and Tella d’Arsenias, Tella and Laqabin, and Laqabin. Thereafter the diocese was normally known as Laqabin, though Tella d’Arsenias was still occasionally used, especially in formal contexts. The twelfth-century bishop Ignatius of Laqabin, consecrated by Michael the Syrian (1166–99), is referred to in Michael’s narrative as bishop of Tella d’Arsenias, but in his lists as bishop of Laqabin. The diocese seems to have been divided for at least part of the thirteenth century, as bishops of both Laqabin and Tella d'Arsenias are attested in 1264.

== Bishops of Laqabin ==
=== Tenth- to twelfth-century bishops ===
Fifteen bishops of Qarna, Tella d’Arsenias and Laqabin are mentioned in the lists of Michael the Syrian.

Name	From	Consecrated in the reign of	Title
Yohannan	Unspecified	Yohannan V (936–53)	Qarna
Luqa	Unspecified	Iwanis II (954–7)	Qarna
Sargis	Shegara d'Pisqin	Yohannan VI (965–86)	Qarna
Timothy	Monastery of Mar Bar Sawma, Melitene	Yohannan VII bar ʿAbdon (1004–30)	Qarna and Tella d'Arsenias
Shemʿon	Monastery of Mar Domitius	Yohannan VII bar ʿAbdon (1004–30)	Tella and Laqabin
Dionysius	Monastery of the Ladders (sblatha)	Yohannan VII bar ʿAbdon (1004–30)	Tella d'Arsenias
Yohannan	Monastery of Bar Gaghi	Dionysius IV Heheh (1032–42)	Tella and Laqabin
Athanasius	Unspecified	Dionysius IV Heheh (1032–42)	Laqabin
Basil	Monastery of Laʿzar of ʿArqa	Yohannan VIII bar Shushan (1063–73)	Laqabin
Yohannan bar Toma	Melitene	Athanasius VI bar Khamara (1091–1129)	Laqabin
Basil	ʿArnish	Yohannan X Maudiana (1129–37)	Laqabin
Iwanis	Monastery of Sergisyeh	Athanasius VII bar Qutreh (1139–66)	Laqabin
Dionysius	Melitene	Athanasius VII bar Qutreh (1139–66)	Laqabin
Timothy Qustan (Constantine)	Monastery of Mar Ahron, Shigar	Michael I (1166–99)	Laqabin
Ignatius	Monastery of Sergisyeh	Michael I (1166–99)	Tella d'Arsenias; Laqabin

Further details of some of these bishops are supplied in the narrative sections of the Chronicle of Michael the Syrian and in the Chronicon Ecclesiasticum of Bar Hebraeus:

- Basil (1129/1137) was deposed for fornication. He subsequently repented and was appointed bishop of the 'monasteries of Zabar' by the patriarch Athanasius VIII in 1143. He was then made bishop of Sibaberek (Severek), where he remained for three years, and was finally deposed after further allegations of improper conduct.
- Dionysius (1139/1166) was present at the consecration of Michael the Syrian in 1166.

=== Thirteenth-century bishops ===
Several thirteenth-century bishops of Laqabin are mentioned in the Chronicon Ecclesiasticum of Bar Hebraeus:

- Eudoxius bar Bitra of Laqabin was present at the synod of Modiq in 1222 which met to elect the patriarch Ignatius III David (1222–52).
- Athanasius Ishoʿ, described by Bar Hebraeus as the 'disciple' of the patriarch Ignatius III David (1222–52), was transferred from the diocese of Laqabin to the diocese of ʿAkko in 1246.
- Ahron Tanzig (1245–7) was appointed bishop of Laqabin in 1245. He supported the archbishop Dionysius of Melitene in his feud with the patriarch Ignatius III David (1222–52), and conspired to depose Ignatius in favour of the maphrian Yohannan bar Maʿdani. In 1247 he 'left his flock and went away to live in idleness in Jerusalem'.
- Gregory Abu'l Faraj bar Ahron (Bar Hebraeus) was transferred from the diocese of Gubos to Laqabin in 1247 to replace Ahron Tanzig, and remained bishop of Laqabin until 1252, when he was transferred to the diocese of Aleppo.
- Athanasius Faraj of Laqabin and Ignatius of Tella d'Arsenias were two of a number of bishops who threatened to denounce the patriarch Ignatius IV Ishoʿ (1264–83) to the Mongols for failing to gain their assent to his election. Evidently the diocese of Laqabin was divided at this period.

In 1283, according to Bar Hebraeus, the diocese of Laqabin and the other suffragan dioceses of the province of Melitene were ruined:

Even if I wanted to be patriarch, as many others do, what is there to covet in the appointment, since so many dioceses of the East have been devastated? Should I set my heart on Antioch, where sighs and groans will meet me? Or the holy diocese of Gumal, where nobody is left to piss against a wall? Or Aleppo, or Mabbugh, or Callinicus, or Edessa, or Harran, all deserted? Or Laqabin, ʿArqa, Qlisura, Semha, Gubos, Qlaudia and Gargar—the seven dioceses around Melitene—where not a soul remains?

Despite the gloomy testimony of Bar Hebraeus, there is evidence that the diocese of Laqabin continued to exist at this period. According to the colophon of a contemporary manuscript, the bishop Timothy 'of Tella d'Arsenias', from the monastery of Baʿuth, was among the fifteen bishops consecrated by the patriarch Philoxenus Nemrud (1283–92).

The diocese of Laqabin is not mentioned in any later source, and probably lapsed in the early years of the fourteenth century.
