= Gubos =

Syriac Orthodox Church diocese in Turkey

Gubos (occasionally spelled Guba) was a diocese in the Syriac Orthodox metropolitan province of Melitene (Malatya), attested between the ninth and thirteenth centuries. Around a dozen Jacobite bishops of Gubos are mentioned either by Michael the Syrian or Bar Hebraeus, and Bar Hebraeus himself was bishop of Gubos from 1246 to 1255. By 1283, as a result of several decades of warfare and brigandage, the diocese of Gubos was ruined. It is not again mentioned, and seems to have lapsed before the end of the thirteenth century.

== Sources ==
The main primary source for the Jacobite bishops of Gubos is the record of episcopal consecrations appended to Volume III of the Chronicle of the Jacobite patriarch Michael the Syrian (1166–99). In this Appendix Michael listed most of the bishops consecrated by the Jacobite patriarchs of Antioch between the ninth and twelfth centuries. Twenty-eight Jacobite patriarchs sat during this period, and in many cases Michael was able to list the names of the bishops consecrated during their reigns, their monasteries of origin, and the place where they were consecrated. For the thirteenth century, Michael's lists are supplemented by numerous references in the Chronicon Syriacum and Chronicon Ecclesiasticum of the Jacobite maphrian Bar Hebraeus (ob.1286).

== Location ==
Gubos was a small town near Melitene (modern Malatya), on the west bank of the Euphrates river, today in Turkey.

== Bishops of Gubos ==
According to the lists of Michael the Syrian, the monk David of the monastery of Mar Joseph was consecrated bishop of 'Garybos' by the patriarch Quriaqos (793–817). The diocese of Garybos is not otherwise attested, and it is possible that David was a bishop of Gubos.

The diocese of Gubos is first unambiguously mentioned in the ninth century, in connection with the 'Heavenly Bread' dispute which exercised the Jacobite Church for several decades. The Jacobite narrative histories of this period mention the bishops Bacchus and Shlemun of Gubos in 808.

Six eleventh- and twelfth-century bishops of Gubos are mentioned in the lists of Michael the Syrian.

| Name | From | Consecrated in the reign of | Place of consecration |
|---|---|---|---|
| Iwanis | Monastery of Mar Bar Sawma, Melitene | Yohannan bar ʿAbdon (1042–57) | not known |
| Dionysius | Monastery of Bar Gaghi, Melitene | Yohannan VIII bar Shushan (1063–73) | not known |
| Dionysius | Monastery of Sergisyeh, Melitene | Athanasius VI bar Khamara (1091–1129) | not known |
| Dionysius | not known | Michael I (1166–99) | not known |
| Timothy | not known | Michael I (1166–99) | not known |
| Ignatius | Monastery of Maqrona, Melitene | Michael I (1166–99) | not known |

Four thirteenth-century bishops of Gubos are mentioned in the Chronicon Ecclesiasticum of Bar Hebraeus. The bishop Bar Sawma of Gubos, who was consecrated in 1255, was the brother's son of the former bishop Laʿzar of Gubos, who sat for an unknown period during the first half of the thirteenth century. Bar Hebraeus himself became bishop of Gubos in 1246, possibly in succession to Laʿzar, and was transferred to the diocese of Laqabin one year later, in 1247. He was succeeded as bishop of Gubos in the same year by Bar Sawma, Laʿzar's nephew. Finally, an unnamed bishop of Gubos was one of three bishops from the Melitene district who were compelled to consecrate the patriarch Philoxenus Nemrud in 1282.

In 1283, according to Bar Hebraeus, the diocese of Gubos and the other suffragan dioceses of the province of Melitene were ruined:

Even if I wanted to be patriarch, as many others do, what is there to covet in the appointment, since so many dioceses of the East have been devastated? Should I set my heart on Antioch, where sighs and groans will meet me? Or the holy diocese of Gumal, where nobody is left to piss against a wall? Or Aleppo, or Mabbugh, or Callinicus, or Edessa, or Harran, all deserted? Or Laqabin, ʿArqa, Qlisura, Semha, Gubos, Qlaudia and Gargar—the seven dioceses around Melitene—where not a soul remains?

The diocese of Gubos is not again mentioned, and probably lapsed before the end of the thirteenth century.
