= Tel Patriq (West Syriac diocese) =

Syriac Orthodox Church diocese in Turkey

Tel Patriq was a diocese of the Syriac Orthodox Church near Melitene (Malatya), attested during the eleventh and twelfth centuries.

== Sources ==
The main primary source for the Syriac Orthodox bishops of Tel Patriq is the record of episcopal consecrations appended to Volume III of the Chronicle of the Syriac Orthodox patriarch Michael the Syrian (1166–99). In this Appendix, Michael listed most of the bishops consecrated by the Syriac Orthodox patriarchs of Antioch between the ninth and twelfth centuries. Twenty-eight Syriac Orthodox patriarchs sat during this period, and in many cases Michael was able to list the names of the bishops consecrated during their reigns, their monasteries of origin, and the place where they were consecrated.

== Location ==
Tel Patriq was a locality near Melitene (modern Malatya), on the west bank of the Euphrates river, in Turkey.

== Bishops of Tel Patriq ==
Five eleventh- and twelfth-century bishops of Tel Patriq are mentioned in the lists of Michael the Syrian.

| Name | From | Consecrated in the reign of | Place of consecration |
|---|---|---|---|
| Dionysius | Unspecified | Yohannan VII bar ʿAbdon (1004–30) | not known |
| Timothy | Monastery of Beth Baʿuth, Hesna d'Ziyad | Athanasius V Haya (1058–64) | not known |
| Ignatius (metropolitan) | Monastery of Mar Ahron, Shigar | Athanasius VI bar Khamara (1091–1129) | not known |
| Iwanis | Monastery of Sarsaq | Athanasius VI bar Khamara (1091–1129) | not known |
| Timothy | Monastery of Qoqa | Athanasius VI bar Khamara (1091–1129) | not known |

Some of these bishops are mentioned again in other sources. Dionysius (1004/30) was taken to Constantinople in 1029 with the patriarch Yohannan VII bar ʿAbdon on the orders of the Byzantine emperor Romanus III Argyrus, and was imprisoned in an attempt to force him to make a Chalcedonian confession of faith. He was later released and returned to govern his diocese. Timothy (1058/1063) consecrated the patriarch Athanasius VII in the church of Rahta in Melitene in 1091.

The diocese of Tel Patriq is not again mentioned after 1091, and probably lapsed during the late-twelfth or thirteenth century.
