= Claudias =

Ancient fortress in the Taurus Mountains

Glaudia (centre) on the road from Melitene to Samosata on the Tabula Peutingeriana map

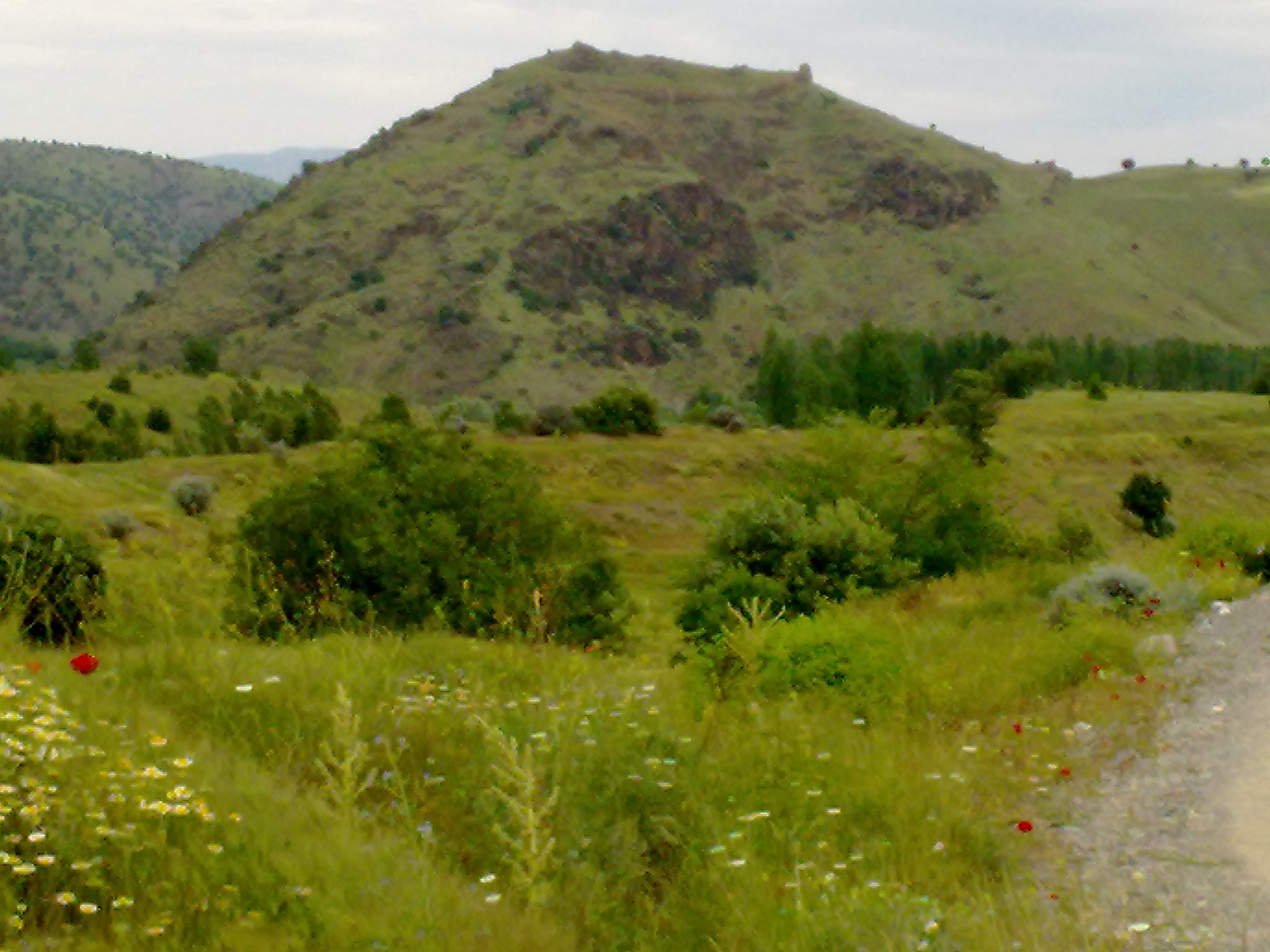
Kerar Kalesi

Claudias or Qlaudia (Arabic: Qalāwdhiya; Syriac: Qlawdiyoye; Greek: Καλούδια, romanized: Kaloudia) was a fortress in the Taurus Mountains and, by extension, its district. Its precise location is now unknown.

Claudias was an ancient fortress, possibly identical with the Claudiopolis mentioned by Pliny the Elder in his Historia naturalis (AD 77). This lay somewhere between Melitene and Samosata. Claudias is mentioned by Ptolemy, Ammianus Marcellinus (as Laudias), the Notitia Dignitatum and the Tabula Peutingeriana (as Glaudia). It guarded the valley of the Euphrates below Melitene and towards Anzitene. It may be identified with Kerar Kalesi in Pütürge.

Claudias changed hands several times during the early Arab–Byzantine wars. Most of northern Mesopotamia came under Arab rule in 637–642. The governor (epitropos) of Claudias in the late 7th century was a certain John, mentioned in the Life of Theodotus of Amida. The Emperor Constantine V captured Claudias from the Arabs and razed it in or about 755. The Christian population was transferred to Constantinople. The Caliph al-Mansur took and rebuilt it in 757 or 758. The Byzantines recaptured it in the early 10th century. It is mentioned in the late 10th-century Byzantine treatise on skirmishing, De velitatione bellica. By the late 11th century, it had passed into the hands of the Danishmendids. By that time it had declined in value as a fortress. Sources later than the 11th century refer only to the region and only on the basis of earlier writings.

Claudias is already mentioned as a district (Syriac athro d-beth qlawdiyoye) in the 6th-century Life of Barsauma (died c. 458) and the 8th-century Life of Theodotus. In 1066, some Armenians settled in the region. It is frequently mentioned in the later Syriac sources, Michael the Syrian and Bar Hebraeus. In the 13th century, Yāqūt believed that Ptolemy was a native of Claudias and called him al-Qalawdī. The 14th-century Persian writer Ḥamd-Allāh Mostawfi refers to Erqalawdiya as a fortress and a fertile region, but he is relying on early sources.

== See also ==
- Qlaudia (West Syriac diocese)

== Bibliography ==
- Cahen, Claude (1978). "Ḳalāwd̲h̲iya". In van Donzel, E.; Lewis, B.; Pellat, Ch. & Bosworth, C. E. (eds.). The Encyclopaedia of Islam, Second Edition. Volume IV: Iran–Kha. Leiden: E. J. Brill. p. 484. OCLC 758278456.
- Hoyland, Robert G. (2023). "The Historical Context of the Life of Theodotus". The Life of Theodotus of Amida: Syriac Christianity under the Umayyad Caliphate. Gorgias Press. pp. 1–23.
- Mordtmann, J. H. [in German] (1927). "Ḳalawd̲h̲iya". In M. Th. Houtsma; A. J. Wensinck; T. W. Arnold (eds.). Encyclopaedia of Islam. Vol. 2 (1st ed.). Leiden: E. J. Brill. p. 687. doi:10.1163/2214-871X_ei1_SIM_3854.
- Palmer, Andrew N., ed. (2020). The Life of the Syrian Saint Barsauma: Eulogy of a Hero of the Resistance to the Council of Chalcedon. University of California Press.
- Ruge, Walther [in German] (1899). "Claudias". Realencyclopädie der classischen Altertumswissenschaft. Vol. 3.2. Stuttgart. cols. 2261–2262.
- Talbert, Richard J., ed. (2000). Barrington Atlas of the Greek and Roman World. Princeton University Press.
