= Kfar Tab (West Syriac diocese) =

Map showing the ancient sites of Upper Mesopotamia and Syria. Kfar Tab is located on the west.

Kfar Tab (Syriac: ܟܦܪܛܐܒ Kafrṭāb) was a diocese of the Syriac Orthodox Church near Apamea in Syria, attested in the eleventh and twelfth centuries. Four of its bishops are mentioned in the lists of Michael the Syrian.

== Sources ==
The main primary source for the Syriac Orthodox bishops of Kfar Tab is the record of episcopal consecrations appended to Volume III of the Chronicle of the Syriac Orthodox patriarch Michael the Syrian (1166–99). In this Appendix Michael listed most of the bishops consecrated by the Syriac Orthodox patriarchs of Antioch between the ninth and twelfth centuries. Twenty-eight Syriac Orthodox patriarchs sat during this period, and in many cases Michael was able to list the names of the bishops consecrated during their reigns, their monasteries of origin, and the place where they were consecrated.

== Bishops of Kfar Tab ==
Four Syriac Orthodox bishops of Kfar Tab are mentioned in the lists of Michael the Syrian.

Name	From	Consecrated in the reign of	Place of consecration
Basil	not known	Dionysius VI (1088–91)	not known
Ignatius	Monastery of Saint Mark's, Jerusalem	Athanasius VI bar Khamara (1091–1129)	not known
Cyril	Monastery of Mar Bar Sawma, Melitene	Athanasius VI bar Khamara (1091–1129)	Monastery of Dovair, Antioch
Philoxenus	Monastery of Dovair, Antioch	Athanasius VII bar Qutreh (1139–66)	Kaishum

The diocese of Kfar Tab seems to have lapsed before the end of the twelfth century.
