= Gumal (West Syriac diocese) =

Syriac Orthodox Church diocese in Iraq

Gumal (also known as Goghmal, Gomel and Marga) was a diocese of the Syriac Orthodox Church. Bishops of Gumal are attested between the sixth and tenth centuries, but the diocese may have persisted into the thirteenth century.

== Sources ==
The main primary sources for the Syriac Orthodox bishops of Gumal are the Chronicle of the Syriac Orthodox patriarch Michael the Syrian (1166–99) and the Chronicon Ecclesiasticum of the Syriac Orthodox maphrian Bar Hebraeus (ob.1286).

== Location ==
The diocese of Gumal was located in the Mosul district of northern Iraq, not far from the celebrated Syriac Orthodox monastery of Mar Mattai. According to Bar Hebraeus, Gumal was 'a large town in the country of Marga, to the northeast of Mount Alpap'. The town is probably connected with the district of Tel Gomel (in Greek, Gaugamela), which gave its name to Alexander the Great’s victory over the Persians at Gaugamela in 333 BC. The battle seems to have been fought at a site close to the modern Assyrian town of Telkepe, in the historic Marga district.

== Bishops of Gumal ==
The diocese of Gumal was the fifth of the twelve dioceses established by the eastern Syriac Orthodox bishops in 595.

Bishop Aitallaha was consecrated in 629 'for the town of Gumal'.

Bishop Yonan of 'Gulmarga' was deposed in 790 at a synod held by the eastern bishops in the monastery of Knushia in the Balad district.

Bishop Barhadbshabba 'of Marga' subscribed to the acts of the synod of Callinicus in 818.

In 1283, according to Bar Hebraeus, the diocese of Gumal was ruined:

Even if I wanted to be patriarch, as many others do, what is there to covet in the appointment, since so many dioceses of the East have been devastated? Should I set my heart on Antioch, where sighs and groans will meet me? Or the holy diocese of Gumal, where nobody is left to piss against a wall?
