= Melitene (West Syriac diocese) =

Syriac Orthodox Church diocese in Turkey

The city of Melitene (modern Malatya) was an archdiocese of the Syriac Orthodox Church, attested between the ninth and thirteenth centuries but probably founded as early as the seventh century. More than thirty Syriac Orthodox bishops or metropolitans of Melitene are mentioned either by Michael the Syrian or in other Syriac Orthodox narrative sources. The archdiocese is last mentioned towards the end of the twelfth century, and seems to have lapsed in the early decades of the thirteenth century.

Melitene among other Syriac Orthodox dioceses in the medieval period

== Bishops and metropolitans of Melitene ==
=== Seventh- and eighth-century bishops ===
The names of four early Syriac Orthodox bishops of Melitene are known. Michael the Syrian provided a cursory list of 28 undated bishops and metropolitans of Melitene, most of whom were bishops consecrated between the ninth and twelfth centuries who featured in his regular lists. The first five names (Leontius, Otreius, Acacius, Mama and Domitian) were of bishops who flourished before the seventh century. According to Michael, these men were followed 'long afterwards' by bishops Thomas, Ezekiel, Gregory and Ahron, presumably to be dated to the seventh and eighth centuries.

=== Ninth- to twelfth-century bishops ===
Twenty dated Syriac Orthodox metropolitans of Melitene between the ninth and the twelfth centuries are mentioned in the lists of Michael the Syrian.

Name	From	Consecrated in the reign of	Place of consecration
Daniel	Mor Bar Sauma Monastery	Dionysius I Telmaharoyo (818–45)	not known
Thomas	Mor Bar Sauma Monastery	Dionysius I Telmaharoyo (818–45)	not known
Thomas	Unspecified	John III (846–73)	not known
Ezekiel	Monastery of Mar Atonos	Ignatius II (878–83)	not known
Eliya	Monastery of Beth Botin	Dionysius II (896–909)	not known
Yohannan	Mor Bar Sauma Monastery	John IV Qurzahli (910–22)	not known
Gregory	Unspecified	Basil I (923–35)	not known
Iwanis	Unspecified	John V (936–53)	not known
Eliya	Monastery of Zuqnin	Iwanis II (954–7)	not known
Ezekiel	Unspecified	Dionysius III (958–61)	not known
Ignatius	Unspecified	John VI Sarigta (965–86)	not known
Iwanis	Monastery of Bārid	Athanasius IV Laʿzar (987–1003)	Not known
Ignatius	Monastery of Qainan of Hadeth	John VII bar ʿAbdon (1004–30)	not known
Yohannan	Monastery of Mar Shayna	Dionysius IV Heheh (1032–42)	Not known
Ignatius	Not specified	Athanasius V Haya (1058–64)	not known
Yohannan Saʿid bar Sabuni	Unspecified	Athanasius VI bar Khamara (1091–1129)	Not known
Iwanis Elishaʿ	Unspecified	Athanasius VI bar Khamara (1091–1129)	Marʿash
Ignatius	Unspecified	Athanasius VII bar Qutreh (1139–66)	not known
Dionysius Gripas bar Samka	Patriarchal residence	Michael I (1166–99)	not known
Iwanis bar Qanun	Unspecified	Michael I (1166–99)	not known
