= Michael II of Antioch =

86th Patriarch of Syriac Orthodox Church of Antioch (1292–1313)

Michael II
- Syriac Orthodox Patriarch of Antioch and All the East
- Church: Syriac Orthodox Church
- See: Antioch
- Installed: 1292
- Term ended: 1312
- Predecessor: Philoxenus I Nemrud
- Successor: Michael III Yeshu

Personal details
- Died: 7 December 1312

Michael II was the Patriarch of Antioch and head of the Syriac Orthodox Church from 1292 until his death in 1312. (Note: Michael is counted as either Michael I as the first patriarch by that name in Cilicia, Michael II (Mikha’il II) after Michael I (r. 1166–1199), or Michael III (Mikha’il III) after Michael II the Younger (r. 1199–1215). Also known as Ignatius Mikhaʾil I, Ignatius Mīkhāʾīl Bar Ṣawmo, or Ignatius Michael. (Arabic: البطريرك ميخائيل الثاني; Syriac: ܦܛܪܝܪܟܐ ܡܝܟܐܝܠ ܬܪܝܢܐ).)

== Biography ==
Upon the death of the patriarch Ignatius IV Yeshu in 1282, Barṣoum, (Note: Also spelt as Barsawma.) archimandrite of the Kuwaykhat Monastery, near Mopsuestia in Cilicia, attempted to win support in his bid to become patriarch, as Ignatius IV Yeshu had been archimandrite of the Kuwaykhat Monastery prior to his election as patriarch. However, Barṣoum was foiled by Yaʿqob, a priest of Qalʿah Rumaita, who forced the bishops of Gubos, Qlisura, and Gargar to consecrate his brother’s son Philoxenus Nemrud as patriarch in 1283 (AG 1594).

Turmoil followed the death of Philoxenus Nemrud in July 1292 (AG 1603) as Constantine, metropolitan of Melitene, bribed three bishops to consecrated him as patriarch in November. Barṣoum, who had the support of western bishops due to his good relationship with the king of Armenia and with the Mongols and Greeks, was also consecrated as patriarch in November by Iyawannis, metropolitan of Tarsus, and Basil, metropolitan of Jerusalem, and assumed the names Ignatius and Michael. Ignatius bar Wahib subsequently was consecrated as patriarch of Mardin in January 1293.

Michael established his patriarchate at the Kuwaykhat Monastery and was recognised as patriarch by the maphrian Barsawma al-Safi. He issued a general proclamation on 6 January 1295 addressed to the dioceses of Konya, Sivas, Caesarea, Aqsara, Qarshihr, Amasya, Niksar, Semando, Konda, and Dawlo and their villages declaring his ascension to the patriarchate, and excommunicated Constantine of Melitene and his supporters. The proclamation was also signed by Iyawannis, metropolitan of Tarsus, and Basil, metropolitan of Jerusalem. In 1301, he resided at the White Monastery near Dara. He served as patriarch of Antioch until his death on 7 December 1312 (AG 1624).

== Bibliography ==
- Barsoum, Aphrem (2003). The Scattered Pearls: A History of Syriac Literature and Sciences. Translated by Matti Moosa (2nd ed.). Gorgias Press.
- Barsoum, Aphrem (2008). History of the Za'faran Monastery. Translated by Matti Moosa. Gorgias Press.
- Burleson, Samuel; Rompay, Lucas van (2011). "List of Patriarchs of the Main Syriac Churches in the Middle East". Gorgias Encyclopedic Dictionary of the Syriac Heritage. Piscataway, NJ: Gorgias Press. pp. 481–491.
- Carlson, Thomas A. (2018). Christianity in Fifteenth-Century Iraq (PDF). Cambridge University Press.
- Wilmshurst, David (2016). Bar Hebraeus The Ecclesiastical Chronicle: An English Translation. Gorgias Press.
- Wilmshurst, David (2019). "West Syrian patriarchs and maphrians". In Daniel King (ed.). The Syriac World. Routledge. pp. 806–813.

Preceded by Philoxenus I Nemrud	Syriac Orthodox Patriarch of Antioch; 1292–1312	Succeeded by Michael III Yeshu
