= Patriarch Athanasius of Antioch =

Patriarch Athanasius of Antioch may refer to:

- Athanasius I Gammolo, Syriac Orthodox Patriarch of Antioch in 595–631
- Athanasius II Baldoyo, Syriac Orthodox Patriarch of Antioch in 683–686
- Athanasius II Dabbas, Greek Orthodox Patriarch of Antioch in 1611–1619
- Athanasius Sandalaya, Syriac Orthodox Patriarch of Antioch in 756–758
- Athanasius III Dabbas, Greek Orthodox Patriarch of Antioch in 1685–1694 and 1720–1724
- Athanasius IV of Salh, Syriac Orthodox Patriarch of Antioch in 986–1002
- Athanasius V Haya, Syriac Orthodox Patriarch of Antioch in 1058–1063
- Athanasius VI bar Khamoro, Syriac Orthodox Patriarch of Antioch in 1091–1129
- Athanasius VII bar Qutreh, Syriac Orthodox Patriarch of Antioch in 1138–1166
- Athanasius VIII, Syriac Orthodox Patriarch of Antioch in 1200–1207
