= John III of the Sedre =

43rd Patriarch of Syriac Orthodox Church of Antioch (631 - 648)

- Syriac Orthodox Patriarch of Antioch and All the East
- Church: Syriac Orthodox Church
- See: Antioch
- Installed: 631
- Term ended: 648
- Predecessor: Athanasius I Gammolo
- Successor: Theodore

Personal details
- Died: 14 December 648

Sainthood
- Feast day: 14 December
- Venerated in: Syriac Orthodox Church

John III of the Sedre (Note: He is counted as either John I, as the first Syriac Orthodox Patriarch of Antioch by that name, John II, or John III.) (Syriac: ܝܘܚܢܢ ܕܣܕܪ̈ܘܗܝ, Arabic: يوحنا ابو السدرات) was the Patriarch of Antioch and head of the Syriac Orthodox Church from 631 until his death in 648. He is commemorated as a saint by the Syriac Orthodox Church, and his feast day is 14 December.

== Biography ==
John was born at the village of Beth ‘Ellaya, and became a monk at either the monastery of Gubo Baroyo, according to the Chronicle of Michael the Syrian, or the monastery of Eusebona, as per Bar Hebraeus' Ecclesiastical History, where he studied Greek, Syriac, and theology. He was consecrated as a deacon, and later became the syncellus (secretary) of the Patriarch Athanasius I Gammolo.

At the conclusion of the Roman-Sasanian war of 602–628, John was sent to meet with Shahanshah Ardashir III of the Sasanian Empire, and then afterwards to travel to the Monastery of Saint Matthew near Nineveh in Assyria to re-establish the union between the Syriac non-Chalcedonians in the Roman and Sasanian empires. He was welcomed by the monastery's archbishop Christopher, archimandrite Addai, and monks, and convinced them to agree to restore the union. After a synod at the monastery and a meeting at Tikrit concluded in favour of the restoration of the union, John returned to Athanasius with Christopher and the bishops George of Sinjar, Daniel of Banuhadra, Gregory of Baremman, and Yardafne of Shahrzoul, and the monks Marutha, Ith Alaha, and Aha. The union between the non-Chalcedonians in the two empires were subsequently restored as a consequence of John's mission.

John succeeded Athanasius as patriarch of Antioch in 631 (AG 942), and was consecrated by the archbishop Abraham of Nisibis. 630/631 (AG 942) is given as the year of John's consecration by the histories of Elijah of Nisibis and Michael the Syrian, whereas the Chronicle of Thomas the Presbyter gives 631/632 (AG 943), and the Zuqnin Chronicle places it in 643/644 (AG 955). Soon after his ascension to the patriarchal office, John witnessed the fall of Roman Syria and the Muslim conquest of the Levant. At the onset of his tenure as patriarch, John exchanged letters with the archbishop Marutha of Tikrit concurrent with the Muslim conquest of Persia, which allowed Marutha to inform John of the persecution of Syriac non-Chalcedonians in the Sasanian Empire by the Nestorian archbishop Barsauma in the 5th century. Formerly, Syriac non-Chalcedonians in Iran had been prevented from corresponding with their coreligionists in the Roman Empire as they had been labelled as Roman sympathisers and spies by Nestorians.

In a single manuscript titled Disputation of John and the Emir written in 874, it is detailed that John was summoned by an unnamed emir to discuss the integrity of the Bible, the divinity of Christ, and Christian sources of law. The debate took place on 9 May 644, and the emir is identified as Umayr ibn Sad al-Ansari. In the disputation, John was made to speak on behalf of all Christians, and was praised for his performance by Chalcedonians who attended the debate. The manuscript was written by one of John's secretaries named Severus to reassure his coreligionists of his safety. At the emir's request, John also had the Gospel translated from Syriac into Arabic by Arab Christians from the Banu Uqayl, Tanukh, and Tayy tribes. The emir had initially demanded that mentions of the name of Christ, the baptism, and the Cross be removed from the translation, but relented following John's refusal.

John died on 14 December 648 (AG 960), and was buried at the Church of Saint Zoora at Amid. John's death is placed in 648 (AG 960) by Michael the Syrian, the Chronicle of 819, and the Chronicle of 846, whilst the Zuqnin Chronicle gives 649/650 (AG 961).

== Works ==
John composed nine prayers of supplication (pl. Syriac: sedre) on, for example, Lent, the resurrection, and repentance, for which he earned the cognomen "of the Sedre". He also wrote three propitiatory prayers (pl. Syriac: ḥusoye) for the celebration of the Eucharist, a liturgy, and a homily on the consecration of the Chrism. In addition to this, John produced a thirty-nine page plerophoria (confession of faith) for the chorepiscopus Theodore, in which he provided a history of the Julianist sect and its leaders, and a christological treatise against the Chalcedonians and Nestorians.

== Bibliography ==
- Barsoum, Aphrem (2003). The Scattered Pearls: A History of Syriac Literature and Sciences. Translated by Matti Moosa (2nd ed.). Gorgias Press.
- Chabot, Jean-Baptiste, ed. (1905). Chronique de Michel le Syrien. Vol. III. Paris: Ernest Leroux.
- Griffith, Sidney H. (2005). "Answering the Call of the Minaret: Christian Apologetics in the World of Islam". In Jan Jacob van Ginkel; Hendrika Lena Murre-van den Berg; Theo Maarten van Lint (eds.). Redefining Christian Identity: Cultural Interaction in the Middle East Since the Rise of Islam. Peeters Publishers. pp. 91–127.
- Harrack, Amir (1999). The Chronicle of Zuqnin, Parts III and IV A.D. 488–775. Toronto: Pontifical Institute of Mediaeval Studies. ISBN 9780888442864.
- Ignatius Jacob III (2008). History of the Monastery of Saint Matthew in Mosul. Translated by Matti Moosa. Gorgias Press.
- Mazzola, Marianna, ed. (2018). Bar 'Ebroyo's Ecclesiastical History : writing Church History in the 13th century Middle East. PSL Research University.
- Palmer, Andrew (1990). Monk and Mason on the Tigris Frontier: The Early History of Tur Abdin. Cambridge University Press.
- Palmer, Andrew, ed. (1993). The Seventh Century in the West Syrian Chronicles. Liverpool University Press.
- Roggema, Barbara (2008). "The Disputation of John and Emir". In David Thomas; Barbara Roggema (eds.). Christian-Muslim Relations: A Bibliographical History. Vol. 1. Brill. pp. 782–785.
- Teule, Herman G. B. (2011). "Yuḥanon of the Sedre". In Sebastian P. Brock; Aaron M. Butts; George A. Kiraz; Lucas Van Rompay (eds.). Gorgias Encyclopedic Dictionary of the Syriac Heritage: Electronic Edition.
- Wilmshurst, David (2019). "West Syrian patriarchs and maphrians". In Daniel King (ed.). The Syriac World. Routledge. pp. 806–813.

Preceded by Athanasius I Gammolo	Syriac Orthodox Patriarch of Antioch; 631–648	Succeeded by Theodore
