= Severus II bar Masqeh =

45th Patriarch of Syriac Orthodox Church of Antioch

- Syriac Orthodox Patriarch of Antioch and All the East
- Church: Syriac Orthodox Church
- See: Antioch
- Installed: 667/668
- Term ended: 684
- Predecessor: Theodore
- Successor: Athanasius II Baldoyo

Sainthood
- Venerated in: Syriac Orthodox Church

Severus II bar Masqeh (Syriac: ܦܛܪܝܪܟܐ ܣܘܝܪܐ ܕܬܪܝܢ, Arabic: البطريرك ساويرا الثاني) was the Patriarch of Antioch and head of the Syriac Orthodox Church from 667/668 until his death in 684. He is commemorated as a saint by the Syriac Orthodox Church.

== Biography ==
Severus was a monk at the monastery of Asphulos near Reshʿayna, and later became the archbishop of Amida. He succeeded Theodore as patriarch of Antioch in 667/668 (AG 979), and was consecrated by John Bar ‘Ebrayta, archbishop of Tarsus. 667/668 (AG 979) is given as the year of Severus' consecration by Bar Hebraeus in his Ecclesiastical History, whilst Michael the Syrian gives 666/667 (AG 978), and the Chronicle of 819, the Chronicle of 846, and the Zuqnin Chronicle place it in 664/665 (AG 976).

In Severus' tenure as patriarch, he attempted to centralise authority in the church by removing the right of the archbishops to ordain suffragan bishops. A number of bishops opposed Severus' challenge to the archbishops' rights, and united under the leadership of Sergius Zkhunoyo, bishop of Germanicia, Ananias of Qartmin, archbishop of Damascus, and Gabriel, bishop of Reshʿayna, and asserted that this right had been established by the fourth canon of the Council of Nicaea in 325, whereas Severus argued this right had been abolished by the Council of Chalcedon in 451. Severus convened a synod at Beth Tellat to settle the dispute in 679/680, but was preempted by his opponents, who declared his deposition as patriarch of Antioch and excommunicated him, to which he responded by excommunicating them also.

The schism endured for four years until Severus, on his deathbed, wrote to John, archbishop of the monastery of Saint Matthew, to authorise him and the bishops Joseph and Sergius to restore communion to his opponents on the condition that they repented and renounced their actions against him. Severus subsequently died in 684 (AG 995), according to Michael the Syrian. Other sources date Severus' death differently, as the Chronicle of 846 and the Zuqnin Chronicle place Severus' death in 682/683 (AG 994), and Bar Hebraeus gives 679/680 (AG 991).

== Works ==
Severus is known to have written a number of propitiatory prayers (pl. Syriac: ḥusoye).

== Bibliography ==
- Barsoum, Ephrem (2003). The Scattered Pearls: A History of Syriac Literature and Sciences. Translated by Matti Moosa (2nd ed.). Gorgias Press.
- Fiey, Jean Maurice (2004). Lawrence Conrad (ed.). Saints Syriaques (in French). The Darwin Press.
- Harrack, Amir (1999). The Chronicle of Zuqnin, Parts III and IV A.D. 488–775. Toronto: Pontifical Institute of Mediaeval Studies. ISBN 9780888442864.
- Mazzola, Marianna, ed. (2018). Bar 'Ebroyo's Ecclesiastical History : writing Church History in the 13th century Middle East. PSL Research University.
- Mazzola, Marianna (2019). "Centralism and Local Tradition : A Reappraisal of the Sources on the Metropolis of Tagrit and Mor Matay". Le Muséon. 132 (3–4): 399–413.
- Moosa, Matti, ed. (2014). The Syriac Chronicle of Michael Rabo (the Great): A Universal History from the Creation. Beth Antioch Press.
- Palmer, Andrew (1990). Monk and Mason on the Tigris Frontier: The Early History of Tur Abdin. Cambridge University Press.
- Palmer, Andrew, ed. (1993). The Seventh Century in the West Syrian Chronicles. Liverpool University Press.
- Van Rompay, Lucas (2011). "Severos bar Mashqo". In Sebastian P. Brock; Aaron M. Butts; George A. Kiraz; Lucas Van Rompay (eds.). Gorgias Encyclopedic Dictionary of the Syriac Heritage: Electronic Edition.

Preceded by Theodore	Syriac Orthodox Patriarch of Antioch; 667/668–684	Succeeded by Athanasius II Baldoyo
