= Theodore (Syriac Orthodox patriarch of Antioch) =

44th Patriarch of Syriac Orthodox Church of Antioch

- Syriac Orthodox Patriarch of Antioch and All the East
- Church: Syriac Orthodox Church
- See: Antioch
- Installed: 649 or 650/1
- Term ended: 664/5 or 666/7
- Predecessor: John III
- Successor: Severus II

Personal details
- Died: 664/5 or 666/7
- Residence: Monastery of Qenneshre

Theodore was the Syriac Orthodox patriarch of Antioch whose term began between 649 and 651 and ended with his death between 664 and 667.

According to Bar Hebraeus, Theodore was a monk in the desert of Skete in Egypt who later moved to the monastery of Qenneshre in Syria. He was consecrated as patriarch of Antioch by the bishop Abraham of Emesa. Sources disagree on the date of Theodore's consecration as patriarch, as it is placed in December 649 by Bar Hebraeus in his Ecclesiastical History, whilst the Zuqnin Chronicle dates the consecration to 650/1. He continued to reside at Qenneshre for the duration of his term as patriarch.

The vita of Theodotus of Amida relates that, when the young Theodotus, a monk of Qenneshre, was preparing to leave the monastery, Theodore convinced him to prolong his stay for one year because he foresaw that his own death was approaching. Theodotus remained in Qenneshre until Theodore's death, and attended the patriarch's funeral before making a pilgrimage to the Holy Land and Egypt. The vita also attests that the patriarch was mourned by Christians and Muslims alike. According to the Zuqnin Chronicle, as well as the Chronicle of 819 and Chronicle of 846, Theodore's death was in 664/5, whereas it is dated to 666/7 by Bar Hebraeus.

== Bibliography ==
Primary sources

- Bar Hebraeus (2018). Ecclesiastical History. Translated by Marianna Mazzola. PSL Research University.

Secondary sources

- Palmer, Andrew (1990). Monk and Mason on the Tigris Frontier: The Early History of Tur Abdin. Cambridge University Press.
- Palmer, Andrew, ed. (1993). The Seventh Century in the West Syrian Chronicles. Liverpool University Press.
- Tannous, Jack B. (2018). The Making of the Medieval Middle East: Religion, Society, and Simple Believers. Princeton University Press.

Preceded by John III	Syriac Orthodox Patriarch of Antioch; 649–666/7 or 650/1–664/5	Succeeded by Severus II
