= Iwannis I =

50th Patriarch of Syriac Orthodox Church of Antioch (739-754)

- Syriac Orthodox Patriarch of Antioch and All the East
- Church: Syriac Orthodox Church
- See: Antioch
- Installed: 739/740
- Term ended: 754/755
- Predecessor: Athanasius III
- Successor: Isaac I

Personal details
- Died: 754/755

Iwannis I (Note: He is also counted as John I, John II, and John III.) (Syriac: ܐܝܘܐܢܝܣ ܩܕܡܝܐ, Arabic: اياونيس الاول) was the Patriarch of Antioch and head of the Syriac Orthodox Church from 739/740 until his death in 754/755.

== Biography ==
=== Early life ===
Iwannis was a monk either at the monastery of Eusebona, according to the Chronicle of Michael the Syrian, or the monastery of Zuqnin, as per Bar Hebraeus' Ecclesiastical History. The Chronography of Elijah of Nisibis attests that Iwannis was later appointed as bishop of Harran, whereas the histories of Michael the Syrian and Bar Hebraeus record that he was bishop of Hauran instead. In 739/740 (AG 1051), after the death of the Patriarch Athanasius III, the bishops met to elect a successor, but as no agreement could be reached, it was agreed that Athanasius Sandalaya, bishop of Maypherqaṭ, was to be entrusted with the organisation of an election by lot. The Ecclesiastical History of Daniel, son of Moses of Tur Abdin, as preserved in Michael the Syrian's history, alleged that Athanasius orchestrated Iwannis' election as he wrote his name on all three ballots, however this can be disregarded as an attempt to discredit Athanasius.

=== Patriarch of Antioch ===
The History of the Patriarchs of Alexandria records that Iwannis was selected as Athanasius III's successor as patriarch by the Caliph Hisham ibn Abd al-Malik. Iwannis met with the Caliph Marwan II at Harran, and presented him with fifty camels laden with gifts, for which he was awarded a decree that authorised him to perform his patriarchal duties. In doing so, he drew the ire of a number of bishops who resented his appeal to secular authority. The patriarch's troubles began in 746/747 on the issue of the succession of the highly coveted diocese of Tur Abdin after the death of its incumbent bishop Athanasius of Nunib. At the request of Cyriacus, bishop of Sijistan, the Caliph Marwan instructed Iwannis not to ordain a bishop of Tur Abdin, thus bringing him into conflict with Athanasius Sandalaya, who as archbishop of Mesopotamia had designated his protégé Dionysius as Athanasius of Nunib's successor.

Opposition to Iwannis grew as the monks of the monastery of Saint Matthew supported Athanasius' right as archbishop to designate candidates to empty suffragan sees, and accused Iwannis of ordaining bishops for eastern dioceses (within the former Sasanian Empire) without the approval of Paul, archbishop of Tikrit, and thus against church canons. In response, Iwannis convened a synod at Muraiba near Reshʿayna that was attended by Athanasius Sandalaya, David, bishop of Dara, Timothy, bishop of Edessa, and thirty other bishops. At the synod, it was decided that Bacchus, bishop of Nineveh, who was in fact responsible for the ordinations without Paul's approval, the bishops he had unlawfully ordained, and the monks of the monastery of Saint Matthew were excommunicated, and Cyriacus was condemned for his attempt to seize the see of Tur Abdin. Cyriacus subsequently took refuge with Athanasius.

In c. 748/749, Iwannis alienated Athanasius Sandalaya further with his transfer of Abay, bishop of Arzen, to the diocese of Amida, instead of Athanasius' protégé Isaiah, bishop of Ashpharin. Due to the decrepitude of Severus, the previous bishop of Amida, Athanasius had made Isaiah responsible for the administration of five districts in the diocese of Amida and expected to have him succeed Severus, but was resentful to learn that Abay was instead appointed to the see as he had bribed the Caliph Marwan's son to instruct Iwannis to do so. The dispute between Iwannis and Athanasius Sandalaya thus came to a head, and the latter resorted to an appeal to the Caliph Marwan by accusing the patriarch of having extorted 150,000 dinars from the archdiocese of Tikrit and the eastern dioceses, and of simony. Iwannis in turn accused Athanasius of keeping a wife disguised as a nun, and of having several mistresses.

Iwannis convened a synod at Harran in 750 to settle the dispute, but Athanasius refused to attend even after he was summoned several times, and thus he and his supporters, namely the bishops Cyriacus of Sijistan, Bacchus of Nineveh, Athanasius of Reshʿayna, Isaiah of Ashpharin, and John, were excommunicated. The Caliph Marwan detained Iwannis at his monastery at Harran, and forbade him from leaving until he had paid 12,000 dinars and made peace with Athanasius. Amidst the Abbasid Revolution, the Caliph Marwan marched east to Iraq to confront the proclamation of the rival Abbasid Caliph As-Saffah, and was accompanied by Athanasius Sandalaya, but was defeated at the Battle of the Zab in February 750. The battle marked the end of Marwan's rule as he found no support in Syria, and fled to Egypt, where he was killed in August 750. Meanwhile, Athanasius Sandalaya returned from Marwan's campaign after having been robbed, whilst Iwannis bided his time at his monastery.

=== Later life ===
Peace was seemingly achieved after Iwannis and Athanasius had been reconciled at a synod at Tarmana near Cyrrhus in 752, but the latter reasserted himself soon after by bribing Abdallah, the Caliph As-Saffah's brother, to provide him with a systaticon (letter of investiture) for the title of archbishop of Mesopotamia, without Iwannis' approval. The Caliph As-Saffah instructed bishops to attend a synod at Tella in the same year, excluding Iwannis, at which they were pressured into accepting Athanasius' title as archbishop of Mesopotamia, and to agree to lift the excommunication that Iwannis had imposed upon Athanasius' supporters at the synods of Harran and of Muraiba. The acknowledgement of Athanasius as archbishop of Mesopotamia is interpreted as a recognition of the extension of his authority from the area coterminous with the former Roman province of Mesopotamia to the area known as the Jazira in Arabic.

Due to his advanced age and the caliph's patronage of Athanasius, Iwannis issued a synodal letter addressed to the bishops at the synod of Tella, in which he forgave them and pardoned their transgressions for the sake of peace in the Church. Iwannis died in October 754/755 (AG 1066), and was buried at the village of Bādiya on the river Euphrates. Iwannis' death is unanimously placed in 754/755 (AG 1066) by the available sources, including the Chronicle of 813, Chronicle of 819, Chronicle of 846, the Zuqnin Chronicle, and the histories of Elijah of Nisibis, Michael the Syrian, and Bar Hebraeus.

== Bibliography ==
- Barsoum, Ephrem (2003). The Scattered Pearls: A History of Syriac Literature and Sciences. Translated by Matti Moosa (2nd ed.). Gorgias Press.
- Burleson, Samuel; Van Rompay, Lucas (2011). "List of Patriarchs: II. The Syriac Orthodox Church and its Uniate continuations". In Sebastian P. Brock; Aaron M. Butts; George A. Kiraz; Lucas Van Rompay (eds.). Gorgias Encyclopedic Dictionary of the Syriac Heritage: Electronic Edition. Gorgias Press.
- Evetts, Basil Thomas Alfred, ed. (1904). History of the Patriarchs of the Coptic Church of Alexandria. Vol. III. Beth Mardutho.
- Harrak, Amir (1999). The Chronicle of Zuqnin, Parts III and IV A.D. 488–775. Toronto: Pontifical Institute of Mediaeval Studies. ISBN 9780888442864.
- Ignatius Jacob III (2008). History of the Monastery of Saint Matthew in Mosul. Translated by Matti Moosa. Gorgias Press.
- Kennedy, Hugh (2004). The Prophet and the Age of the Caliphates: The Islamic Near East from the Sixth to the Eleventh Century. Pearson Education.
- Mazzola, Marianna, ed. (2018). Bar 'Ebroyo's Ecclesiastical History : writing Church History in the 13th century Middle East. PSL Research University.
- Moosa, Matti, ed. (2014). The Syriac Chronicle of Michael Rabo (the Great): A Universal History from the Creation. Beth Antioch Press.
- Morony, Michael (2005). "History and Identity in the Syrian Churches". In Jan Jacob van Ginkel; Hendrika Lena Murre-van den Berg; Theo Maarten van Lint (eds.). Redefining Christian Identity: Cultural Interaction in the Middle East Since the Rise of Islam. Peeters Publishers. pp. 1–35.
- Palmer, Andrew (1990). Monk and Mason on the Tigris Frontier: The Early History of Tur Abdin. Cambridge University Press.
- Wilmshurst, David (2019). "West Syrian patriarchs and maphrians". In Daniel King (ed.). The Syriac World. Routledge. pp. 806–813.
- Wood, Philip (2020). "Christian Elite Networks in the Jazīra, c.730–850". In Hannah-Lena Hagemann; Stefan Heidemann (eds.). Transregional and Regional Elites – Connecting the Early Islamic Empire. De Gruyter. pp. 359–384.

Preceded by Athanasius III	Syriac Orthodox Patriarch of Antioch; 739/740–754/755	Succeeded by Isaac I
