= Athanasius II Baldoyo =

46th Patriarch of Syriac Orthodox Church of Antioch (684-687)

- Syriac Orthodox Patriarch of Antioch and All the East
- Church: Syriac Orthodox Church
- See: Antioch
- Installed: 684
- Term ended: 687
- Predecessor: Severus II bar Masqeh
- Successor: Julian III

Personal details
- Born: Balad
- Died: 687

Athanasius II Baldoyo (Syriac: ܐܬܢܐܣܝܘܣ ܕܬܪܝܢ ܒܠܕܝܐ, Arabic: اثناسيوس الثاني البلدي), also known as Athanasius of Balad, and Athanasius of Nisibis, was the Patriarch of Antioch and head of the Syriac Orthodox Church from 684 until his death in 687.

== Biography ==
Athanasius was born at Balad, and studied Syriac, Greek, and sciences under Severus Sebokht at the monastery of Qenneshre, where he became friends with Jacob of Edessa. After becoming a monk at the monastery of Beth Malka near Antioch, he continued his studies, and was educated in philosophy. Athanasius was later ordained as a priest, and made his residence at Nisibis.

In the tenure of the Patriarch Severus II bar Masqeh, the church had suffered schism between the patriarch and a number of bishops over the issue of the right of archbishops to ordain suffragan bishops. On his deathbed, Severus authorised John, archbishop of the monastery of Saint Matthew, to reconcile with the errant bishops, and after his death earlier in the year, a synod was held at the monastery of Asphulos near Reshʿayna in the summer of 684. At the synod, the schism was brought to an end, and Athanasius was consecrated as Severus' successor as patriarch of Antioch by Ananias, bishop of Merde and Kfar Tutho.

Athanasius' consecration is placed in 684 (AG 995) in the Chronicle of Michael the Syrian and the Ecclesiastical History of Bar Hebraeus, whereas the Chronicle of 846 and Zuqnin Chronicle erroneously give 687 (AG 999) due to confusion between Athanasius' consecration and death. In the same year as his ascension to the patriarchal office, he issued an encyclical addressed to rural bishops (chorepiscopi) and priests (periodeutai) on the relationship between adherents and other religious groups. In the encyclical, Athanasius forbade priests from baptising or giving the Eucharist to Julianists, Nestorians, and other sects. The encyclical also expressed Athanasius' condemnation of Christian women who married Muslims, but he did permit them to continue to receive the Eucharist, and encouraged clergy to ensure the children of these marriages were baptised, did not participate in Muslim festivals, and did not consume sacrificial meat.

Prior to his death, Athanasius instructed the bishop Sergius Zkhunoyo to consecrate his student George as bishop of the Arabs. Athanasius subsequently died in September 687. 687 (AG 998) is derived as the year of Athanasius' death from the histories of Michael the Syrian and Bar Hebraeus, whilst the Zuqnin Chronicle places it in 703/704 (AG 1015).

== Works ==
Athanasius was a prolific translator of Greek works into Syriac, including Porphyry's Isagoge in January 645, as well as an anonymous Greek text on logic. At the request of the archbishops Matthew of Aleppo and Daniel of Edessa, Athanasius translated nine treatises of the Hexameron by Basil of Caesarea in 666/667. In 669, whilst at Nisibis, he completed a translation of a number of letters of Severus of Antioch following a commission from Matthew of Aleppo and Daniel of Edessa. Severus of Antioch's second discourse against Nephalius, several homilies by Gregory of Nazianzus, and the book of Pseudo-Dionysius the Areopagite were also translated by Athanasius. He is also known to have translated several works of Aristotle, such as Prior Analytics, Topics, and Sophistical Refutations.

In addition to his translations, Athanasius composed prayers of supplication, three of which are to be used at the celebration of the Eucharist, and prayers for the dead.

== Bibliography ==
- Barsoum, Ephrem (2003). The Scattered Pearls: A History of Syriac Literature and Sciences. Translated by Matti Moosa (2nd ed.). Gorgias Press.
- Brock, Sebastian P. (2011). "Giwargi, bp. of the Arab tribes". In Sebastian P. Brock; Aaron M. Butts; George A. Kiraz; Lucas Van Rompay (eds.). Gorgias Encyclopedic Dictionary of the Syriac Heritage: Electronic Edition. Beth Mardutho.
- Harrack, Amir (1999). The Chronicle of Zuqnin, Parts III and IV A.D. 488–775. Toronto: Pontifical Institute of Mediaeval Studies. ISBN 9780888442864.
- King, Daniel, ed. (2019). The Syriac World. Routledge.
- Mazzola, Marianna, ed. (2018). Bar 'Ebroyo's Ecclesiastical History : writing Church History in the 13th century Middle East. PSL Research University.
- Palmer, Andrew, ed. (1993). The Seventh Century in the West Syrian Chronicles. Liverpool University Press.
- Penn, Michael Philip (2011). "Athanasios II of Balad". In Sebastian P. Brock; Aaron M. Butts; George A. Kiraz; Lucas Van Rompay (eds.). Gorgias Encyclopedic Dictionary of the Syriac Heritage: Electronic Edition.
- Penn, Michael Philip (2015). When Christians First Met Muslims: A Sourcebook of the Earliest Syriac Writings on Islam. University of California Press.
- Tannous, Jack B. (2018). "George, Bishop of the Arab Tribes". In Oliver Nicholson (ed.). The Oxford Dictionary of Late Antiquity. Vol. 1. Oxford University Press. pp. 653–654.
- Tannous, Jack (2020). The Making of the Medieval Middle East: Religion, Society, and Simple Believers. Princeton University Press.
- Van Rompay, Lucas (2011). "Severos bar Mashqo". In Sebastian P. Brock; Aaron M. Butts; George A. Kiraz; Lucas Van Rompay (eds.). Gorgias Encyclopedic Dictionary of the Syriac Heritage: Electronic Edition.
- Weitz, Lev E. (2018). Between Christ and Caliph: Law, Marriage, and Christian Community in Early Islam. University of Pennsylvania Press.

| Preceded by Severus II bar Masqeh | Syriac Orthodox Patriarch of Antioch; 684–687 | Succeeded by Julian III |
