= Elias I of Antioch =

48th Patriarch of the Syriac Orthodox Church of Antioch (709 - 723)

Elias I
- Syriac Orthodox Patriarch of Antioch and All the East
- Church: Syriac Orthodox Church
- See: Antioch
- Installed: 709
- Term ended: 723
- Predecessor: Julian III
- Successor: Athanasius III

Personal details
- Died: 3 October 723

Sainthood
- Feast day: 3 November
- Venerated in: Syriac Orthodox Church

Elias I of Antioch (Syriac: ܐܠܝܐ ܩܕܡܝܐ, Arabic: ايليا الاول) was the Patriarch of Antioch and head of the Syriac Orthodox Church from 709 until his death in 723. He is commemorated as a saint by the Syriac Orthodox Church in the Martyrology of Rabban Sliba, and his feast day is 3 November.

== Biography ==
Elias was born to a Chalcedonian family, but joined the non-Chalcedonian Syriac Orthodox Church upon reading the works of Severus of Antioch. He became a monk at the monastery of Gubo Baroyo, and was later ordained as bishop of Apamea in c. 691. Elias succeeded Julian III as patriarch of Antioch in 709 and was consecrated at the monastery of Gubo Baroyo. Elias's consecration is placed in 709 (AG 1020) by the Chronicle of 819, the Chronicle of 846, the Chronicle of Michael the Syrian, and the Ecclesiastical History of Bar Hebraeus, whereas the Zuqnin Chronicle gives 708 (AG 1019).

Upon his ascension to the patriarchal office, Elias released Denha, archbishop of Tikrit, who had been imprisoned by the Patriarch Julian III at the monastery of Qenneshre for insubordination, and accompanied him on his return to Tikrit to ensure he was accepted there before returning to his residence at the monastery of Gubo Baroyo. Elias presented himself before the Caliph Al-Walid I at Hasarta, and was honoured by him.

Elias consecrated a church at Sarmada in Syria in 722, despite the protestations of the local Chalcedonians. He became the first non-Chalcedonian patriarch of Antioch to enter Antioch since the deposition of Severus of Antioch in 518 when, in the last year of his life, he consecrated a new church there. Elias died at the age of eighty-two on 3 October 723, and was buried at the monastery of Gubo Baroyo. Elias's death is placed in 723 (AG 1035) by the Chronicle of 819, the Chronicle of 846, and the histories of Michael the Syrian and Bar Hebraeus, whilst it is dated to 729 (AG 1041) by the Zuqnin Chronicle.

== Works ==
Whilst bishop of Apamea, Elias composed a defence of the christological doctrine of the Syriac Orthodox Church in a letter in response to Leo, the Chalcedonian bishop of Harran. The forty-page letter consisted of twelve chapters, and cited Church Fathers, including Athanasius of Alexandria, Gregory of Nazianzus, Gregory of Nyssa, Ambrose, and Cyril of Alexandria. He also referenced Simeon of the Olives, the non-Chalcedonian bishop of Harran, and the Chalcedonian bishops John of Damascus, George of Martyropolis, and Constantine of Harran. The letter survives in two manuscripts.

As patriarch, Elias wrote a letter with George, bishop of Ruḥīn, to the clergy of the village of Ruḥīn; only an extract of the letter is still extant.

== Bibliography ==
- Barsoum, Aphrem (2003). The Scattered Pearls: A History of Syriac Literature and Sciences. Translated by Matti Moosa (2nd ed.). Gorgias Press.
- Fiey, Jean Maurice (2004). Lawrence Conrad (ed.). Saints Syriaques (in French). The Darwin Press.
- Harrak, Amir (1999). The Chronicle of Zuqnin, Parts III and IV A.D. 488–775. Toronto: Pontifical Institute of Mediaeval Studies. ISBN 9780888442864.
- Mazzola, Marianna, ed. (2018). Bar 'Ebroyo's Ecclesiastical History : writing Church History in the 13th century Middle East. PSL Research University.
- Moosa, Matti, ed. (2014). The Syriac Chronicle of Michael Rabo (the Great): A Universal History from the Creation. Beth Antioch Press.
- Morony, Michael (2005). "History and Identity in the Syrian Churches". In Jan Jacob van Ginkel; Hendrika Lena Murre-van den Berg; Theo Maarten van Lint (eds.). Redefining Christian Identity: Cultural Interaction in the Middle East Since the Rise of Islam. Peeters Publishers. pp. 1–35.
- Palmer, Andrew (1990). Monk and Mason on the Tigris Frontier: The Early History of Tur Abdin. Cambridge University Press.
- Wilmshurst, David (2019). "West Syrian patriarchs and maphrians". In Daniel King (ed.). The Syriac World. Routledge. pp. 806–813.

Preceded by Julian III	Syriac Orthodox Patriarch of Antioch; 709–723	Succeeded by Athanasius III
