= Julian II =

Julian II may refer to:

- Julian (emperor), Roman emperor 361–363
- Julian II the Roman, Syriac Orthodox patriarch of Antioch 688–708
