= Athanasius III =

Athanasius III may refer to:

- Athanasius III (r. 724–739/740), Syriac Orthodox Patriarch of Antioch
- Pope Athanasius III of Alexandria (r. 1250–1261), Coptic Orthodox Pope
- Patriarch Athanasius III of Alexandria (r. 1276–1316), Greek Patriarch of Alexandria
- Patriarch Athanasius III of Constantinople (1597–1654), twice Patriarch of Constantinople
- Athanasius III Dabbas (1647–1724), last Patriarch of Antioch before the final split of 1724 which divided the Melkite Church between the Melkite Greek Catholic Church and the Greek Orthodox Church of Antioch
