= Melkite Chronicle =

The Melkite Chronicle or Chronicle of 641 is an anonymous world chronicle written in Syriac shortly after the death of the Emperor Heraclius in 641.

The chronicle is preserved in a single copy in the 8th- or 9th-century manuscript codex Sinai syr. 10 at folios 42–53. The codex also contains anti-Miaphysite polemics. The copy of the chronicle is damaged and not complete in its present state. André de Halleux argued that it is an epitome of a longer work written between 641 and 680, likely in 642. It has also been suggested that the longer original was written in the late 6th century and the epitomized and extended with a brief record of imperial reigns down to 641.

The chronicle was the work of a Chalcedonian cleric in Syria. Although usually labelled Melkite, this is something of a misnomer, since this terminology did not come into use until after the Third Council of Constantinople (680/681). The anonymous author did not use the Chronicle of Eusebius of Caesarea. He did, however, use a now lost Miaphysite source also used by two Miaphysite Syriac chronicles: the Chronicle of 819 and the Chronicle of 846. He also made use of the historical compilation of Pseudo-Zacharias Rhetor.

The chronicle begins with Adam and continues down to the death of Heraclius. For the early period it borrows its chronology from the Hebrew Bible. For the Christian era, it lists the holders of the patriarchal sees. It offers a Chalcedonian account of the ecumenical councils and contains denunciations of the errors of Arius and Nestorius. From the time of Nestorius, it gets more detailed. It is most valuable for its coverage of the church in the 6th century. It contains unique Syriac accounts of the synods of 536, 553 and 571 in Constantinople. The acts of the poorly known council of 571 are lost and the Melkite Chronicle provides information not found elsewhere. Its most detailed coverage concerns Philoxenus of Mabbugh, Severus of Antioch and, to a lesser extent, Timothy Aelurus, all of whom are accused of error and lust for power.

== Bibliography ==
- Allen, Pauline (1980). "Zachariah Scholasticus and the Historia Ecclesiastica of Evagrius Scholasticus". Journal of Theological Studies. New Series. 31 (2): 471–488. doi:10.1093/jts/XXXI.2.471. JSTOR 23961810.
- Brock, Sebastian (1979–80). "Syriac Historical Writing: A Survey of the Main Sources". Journal of the Iraqi Academy (Syriac Corporation). 5: 296–326 [1–30].
- Ginkel, Jan van (2016). "Melkite Chronicle of 641". In Graeme Dunphy; Cristian Bratu (eds.). Encyclopedia of the Medieval Chronicle. Brill Online. doi:10.1163/2213-2139_emc_SIM_01815.
- Halleux, André de (1977). "Trois synodes impériaux du VI^{e} siècle dans une chronique syriaque inédite". In Robert H. Fischer (ed.). A Tribute to Arthur Vööbus: Studies in Early Christian Literature and Its Environment, Primarily in the Syrian East. Lutheran School of Theology at Chicago. pp. 295–307.
- Halleux, André de (1978). "La Chronique melkite abrégée du Ms. Sinaï Syr. 10". Le Muséon. 91: 5–44.
- Kaufhold, Hubert (2012). "Sources of Canon Law in the Eastern Churches". In Wilfried Hartmann; Kenneth Pennington (eds.). The History of Byzantine and Eastern Canon Law to 1500. Catholic University of America Press. pp. 215–342.
- Palmer, Andrew (1993). The Seventh Century in the West-Syrian Chronicles. Liverpool University Press.
- Witakowski, Witold (2011). "Historiography, Syriac". In Sebastian P. Brock; Aaron M. Butts; George A. Kiraz; Lucas Van Rompay (eds.). Gorgias Encyclopedic Dictionary of the Syriac Heritage. Gorgias Press.
