= Henryków Yew =

Oldest tree in Poland

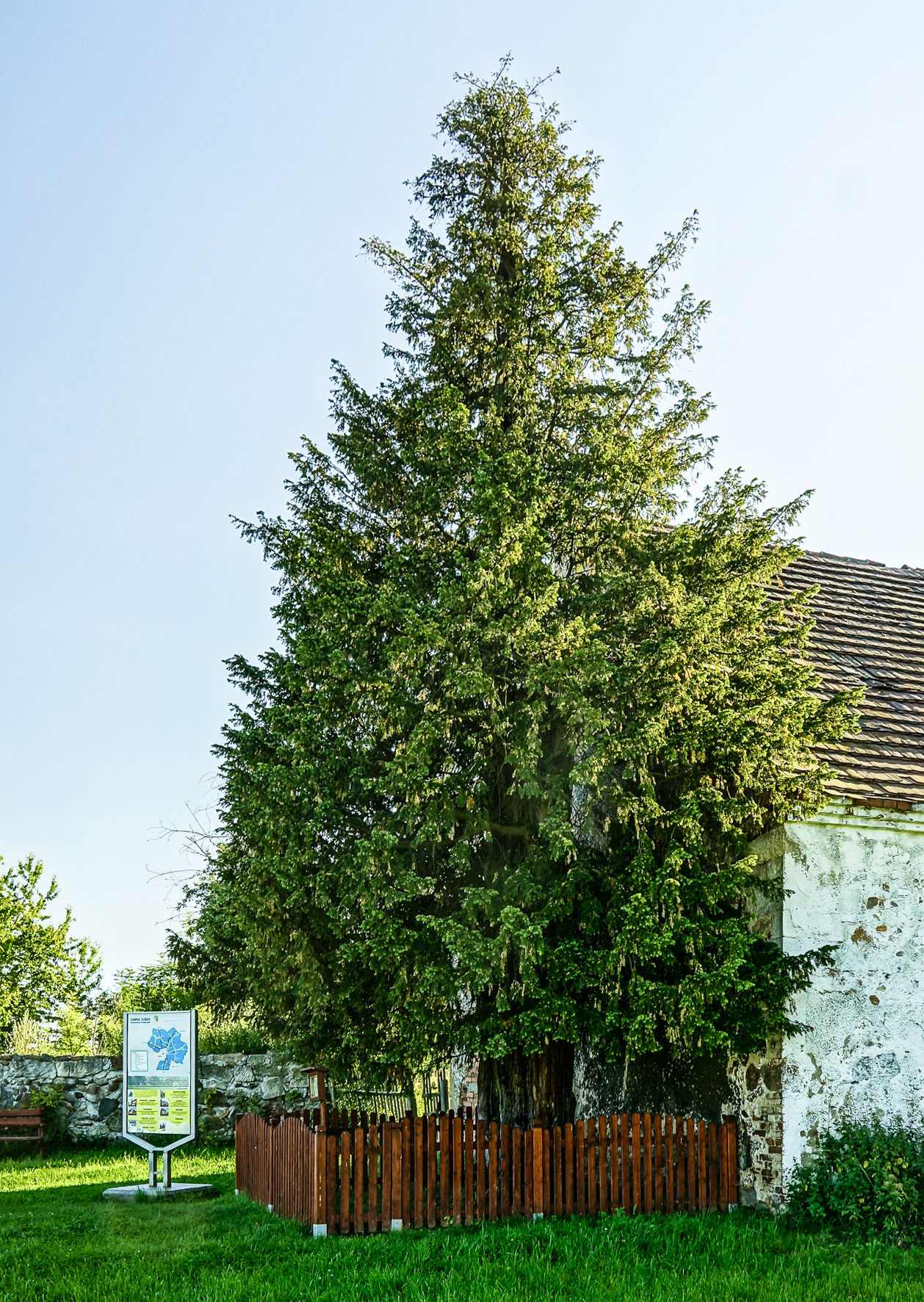
- Interactive map of Henryków Yew
- Native name: Cis Henrykowski (Polish)
- Species: Taxus baccata
- Location: Henryków Lubański
- Height: 10,5 meters
- Diameter: 4,25 meters
- Date seeded: approx.724

Henryków Yew (Polish: Cis Henrykowski, German: Eibe von Hennersdorf) also known as Henryk, is an specimen of Taxus baccata, growing in Henryków Lubański in Lower Silesian Voivodeship in Poland.

It is about 1300 years old, making it the oldest known tree in Poland.

== History ==
In 2023 it was calculated that it started growing in 724 A.C.

From 1988 to 1989 a tornado destroyed one of the tree's branches, which has decreased the diameter of it. Before that the diameter was 5.12 meters.

In 2016 the tree started to wither. It turned out, that moles and voles lived in the roots of the yew, which have been eating them.

In 2017 the tree got the name Henryk.
