= Theodotus of Amida =

Syriac Orthodox monk and bishop

Theodotus of Amida (died 15 August 698) was a Syriac Orthodox monk, bishop and holy man.

Theodotus was born in the village of Anat near the city of Amida in Roman Mesopotamia before the Arab conquest of 637–642. After developing an interest in asceticism and the Bible, he entered the monastery of Zuqnin. He came under the influence of Severus, whom he followed to the monastery of Qenneshre. On the death of the Patriarch Theodore in 666 or 667, he left Qenneshre on a pilgrimage to Jerusalem and Mount Sinai. He then spent five years in Egypt before returning to Amida. From there he moved to the region of Claudias. After five years, he was elected bishop of Amida and consecrated by the Patriarch Julian II around 690. He soon left Amida to reside in Qenneshre. He ultimately founded his own monastery near Qeleth. He died there on 15 August 698.

Early in the eighth century, a certain Symeon (Shemʿūn), a priest and precentor from Samosata, wrote a biography of Theodotus in Syriac. He based it largely on the eyewitness testimony of Theodotus' disciple Joseph (Yawsep). It "is one of the longest extant narrative sources of any kind from early Umayyad northern Mesopotamia" and, more importantly, "a securely dated eye-witness account of life under Arab Muslim rule in the first century of Islam". It is known from three manuscripts. The earliest is a late twelfth-century copy in Damascus, now damaged. A copy of it, made by Yuhanon Dolabani, is in Mardin. A translation into Arabic is found in Garshuni script in a manuscript of Jerusalem. It is based on the Damascus copy, but was made before that one was damaged. The complete text is reconstructed from the Damascus and Jerusalem manuscripts.

Theodotus is regarded as a saint by the Syriac Orthodox, who keep his feast on 15 August and 8 September. In his own time, he was regarded as a holy man. He wandered about with a bag of relics, performing exorcisms and healings. Ecclesiastical authorities were divided over him. Some sought to press him into a formal office, but his contemporary, George, Bishop of the Arabs, declared that "wandering monks bearing bags and reliquaries of saints should not be welcomed" in the church.

The first critical edition and English translation of the Syriac Life of Theodotus of Amida was published in 2023 by Robert G. Hoyland and Andrew N. Palmer.

== Bibliography ==
- Fiey, Jean Maurice (2004). Saints syriaques. Darwin Press.
- Hoyland, Robert G. (1997). Seeing Islam As Others Saw It: A Survey and Evaluation of Christian, Jewish and Zoroastrian Writings on Early Islam. Darwin Press.
- Hoyland, Robert G.; Palmer, Andrew N., eds. (2023). The Life of Theodotus of Amida: Syriac Christianity under the Umayyad Caliphate. Gorgias Press.
- Hoyland, Robert G. "The Historical Context of the Life of Theodotus". In Hoyland & Palmer (2023), pp. 1–23.
- Palmer, Andrew (1990). Monk and Mason on the Tigris Frontier: The Early History of Tur 'Abdin. Cambridge University Press. ISBN 9780521360265.
- Palmer, Andrew (2008). "Symeon of Samosata". In David Thomas; Barbara Roggema (eds.). Christian–Muslim Relations: A Bibliographical History. Vol. 1 (600–900). Brill. pp. 186–189.
- Palmer, Andrew. "Introduction to the Syriac Edition". In Hoyland & Palmer (2023), pp. 25–75.
- Tannous, Jack (2011). "Theodotos of Amid". In Sebastian P. Brock; Aaron M. Butts; George A. Kiraz; Lucas Van Rompay (eds.). Gorgias Encyclopedic Dictionary of the Syriac Heritage: Electronic Edition. Gorgias Press. Published online by Beth Mardutho in 2018.
- Tannous, Jack (2018). "Theodota of Amida". In Nicholson, Oliver (ed.). The Oxford Dictionary of Late Antiquity, Volume 2: J–Z. Oxford: Oxford University Press. p. 1486. ISBN 978-0-19-881625-6.
- Tannous, Jack (2018b). The Making of the Medieval Middle East: Religion, Society, and Simple Believers. Princeton University Press.
