= 724 =

Calendar year

724 in various calendars
Gregorian calendar	724; DCCXXIV
Ab urbe condita	1477
Armenian calendar	173; ԹՎ ՃՀԳ
Assyrian calendar	5474
Balinese saka calendar	645–646
Bengali calendar	130–131
Berber calendar	1674
Buddhist calendar	1268
Burmese calendar	86
Byzantine calendar	6232–6233
Chinese calendar	癸亥年 (Water Pig); 3421 or 3214 — to — 甲子年 (Wood Rat); 3422 or 3215
Coptic calendar	440–441
Discordian calendar	1890
Ethiopian calendar	716–717
Hebrew calendar	4484–4485
- Hindu calendars
Vikram Samvat	780–781
Shaka Samvat	645–646
Kali Yuga	3824–3825
Holocene calendar	10724
Iranian calendar	102–103
Islamic calendar	105–106
Japanese calendar	Yōrō 8 / Jinki 1 (神亀元年)
Javanese calendar	617–618
Julian calendar	724; DCCXXIV
Korean calendar	3057
Minguo calendar	1188 before ROC 民前1188年
Nanakshahi calendar	−744
Seleucid era	1035/1036 AG
Thai solar calendar	1266–1267
Tibetan calendar	ཆུ་མོ་ཕག་ལོ་ (female Water-Boar); 850 or 469 or −303 — to — ཤིང་ཕོ་བྱི་བ་ལོ་ (male Wood-Rat); 851 or 470 or −302

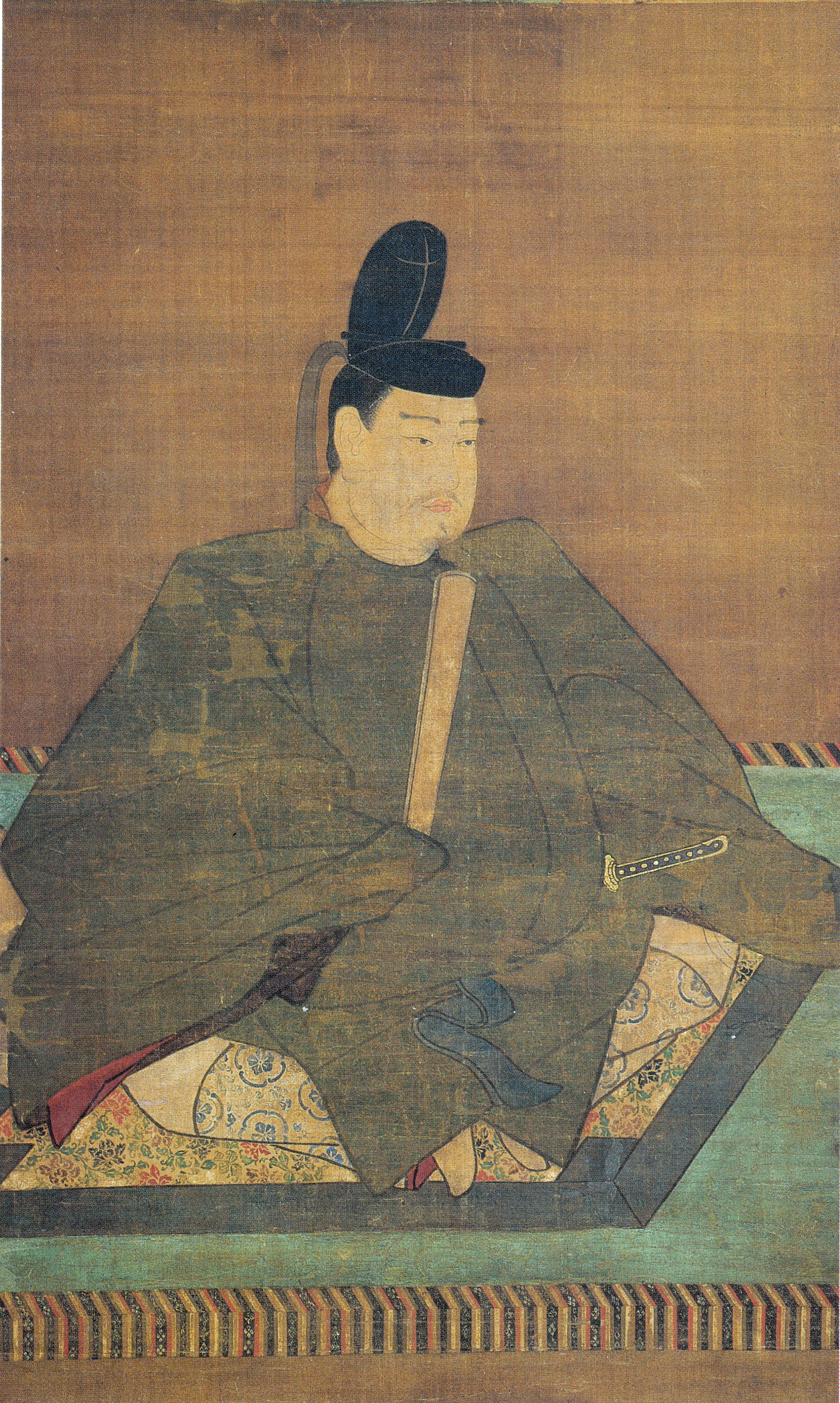
March 3: Emperor Shōmu becomes the new ruler of Japan upon the abdication of his aunt.

Year 724 (DCCXXIV) was a leap year starting on Saturday of the Julian calendar, the 724th year of the Common Era (CE) and Anno Domini (AD)

== Events ==
=== By date ===
- January 26 – (24 Sha'ban 105 AH) Hisham ibn Abd al-Malik, becomes the new Caliph of the Umayyad Caliphate, which covers most of the Middle East, North Africa and Spain, after his brother Yazid II dies of tuberculosis following a 4-year reign. Hisham reigns for 19 years, during which he appoints Khalid al-Qasri as of Governor of Iraq
- February – Al-Jarrah ibn Abdallah of the Umayyad Caliphate inflicts a crushing defeat on the Khazars of what is now Russia in a battle fought between the Cyrus and Araxes Rivers.
- March 3 – Empress Genshō abdicates the throne, in favor of her 23-year-old nephew, Prince Obito, who becomes the 45th monarch of Japan as the Emperor Shōmu. He is the son of the late Emperor Monmu.
- March 6 – Muhammad ibn Abd al-Malik ibn Marwan, the son of the Caliph Abd al-Malik, is appointed as the Umayyad Governor of Egypt after Hanzala ibn Safwan al-Kalbi resigns. He serves for only two months.
- April – Athanasius III becomes the new Patriarch of the Syriac Orthodox Church, six months after the death of Elias I.
- May 2 – Muhammand ibn Marwan resigns as Governor of Egypt after a difference of opinion on policy, and is replaced by Al-Hurr ibn Yusuf.
- July 11 – Prince Æthelbert of the Kingdom of Kent issues a charter that is approved by his father, King Wihtred.
- August 15 – China's Emperor Xuanzong deposes his wife, the Empress consort Wang.
- December 29 – K'ak' Tiliw Chan Yopaat becomes king (ajaw) of the Maya city-state of Quiriguá, now in Guatemala), and serves for more than 60 years until his death in 785.

=== By place ===
==== Europe ====
- Ragenfrid, ex-mayor of the palace of Neustria, revolts against Charles Martel. He is easily defeated, and Ragenfrid gives up his sons as hostages, in return for being allowed to keep his lands in Anjou.
- Cináed mac Írgalaig, also known as "the one-eyed", becomes High King of Ireland.

==== Arabian Empire ====
- The Turgesh Khaganate scores a major victory over the Arabs, in the "Day of Thirst" near Khujand (modern Tajikistan).
- A Muslim fleet raids the Byzantine-ruled Balearic Islands, as well as Byzantine Sardinia and Lombard Corsica.

=== By topic ===
==== Architecture ====
- Shōmu orders that houses of the Japanese nobility be roofed with green tiles, as in China, and have white walls with red roof poles (approximate date).

==== Religion ====
- Pirmin, Visigothic monk, is appointed abbot of Mittelzell Abbey at Reichenau Island, which he has founded.
- Hugh of Champagne, grandson of Pepin of Herstal, is appointed bishop of Bayeux.

== Births ==
- Dong Jin, Chinese official and general
- Fujiwara no Hamanari, Japanese noble and poet

== Deaths ==
- January 26 – Yazid II, Muslim caliph (b. 687)
- Felix, archbishop of Ravenna
- Fogartach mac Néill, High King of Ireland
- Hababah, concubine singer of Caliph Yazid II.
- Rotrude of Treves, wife of Charles Martel
- Tonyukuk, military leader of the Göktürks (approximate date)
