= Julian II the Roman =

47th Patriarch of Syriac Orthodox Church of Antioch (687 - 708)

Julian II
- Syriac Orthodox Patriarch of Antioch and All the East
- Church: Syriac Orthodox Church
- Installed: 687
- Term ended: 708
- Predecessor: Athanasius II Baldoyo
- Successor: Elias I

Personal details
- Died: 708
- Residence: Monastery of Qenneshre

Julian II, (Note: He is counted as either Julian II, as the second Syriac Orthodox Patriarch of Antioch by that name, or Julian III.) also known as Julian the Roman or Julian the Soldier (Syriac: Yulyanos Rūmōyō), was the Patriarch of Antioch and head of the Syriac Orthodox Church from 687 until his death in 708.

== Biography ==
=== Early life ===
Julian was the son of a soldier in the army of the Roman general David the Armenian and a Syrian woman. Julian grew up in the army with his father, and participated in David's campaign in Mesopotamia, for which he earned the cognomen "the Roman". Whilst in the army, he was part of a Syrian contingent under the command of Titus, which did not take part in the atrocities committed by David's soldiers at Beth Ma'de, and survived the rest of the army's destruction by withdrawing to Amida. It is suggested that Titus was fabricated by the historian Dionysius of Tel Mahre, whose work survives in the Chronicle of Michael the Syrian, to disassociate Julian from events at Beth Ma'de.

After the failure of David's expedition into Mesopotamia, Julian was brought to the monastery of Qenneshre by his father, where he became a monk and was educated in Greek. He was regarded as exceptionally handsome.

=== Patriarch ===
Julian succeeded Athanasius II Baldoyo as patriarch of Antioch in November 687 (AG 999), and was consecrated by Athanasius of Sarug at Amida, according to the histories of Michael the Syrian and Bar Hebraeus. The Chronicle of 846 details that he became patriarch at the monastery of Jacob of Cyrrhus. Julian's consecration is placed in 687 (AG 999) by the Chronicle of 846 and the histories of Michael the Syrian and Bar Hebraeus, whereas the Zuqnin Chronicle erroneously gives 703/704 (AG 1015).

Soon after his ascension to the patriarchal office, Julian came into conflict with the archbishop Jacob of Edessa on the observance of ecclesiastical canons. Jacob had defrocked and expelled clergymen for uncanonical behaviour, but Julian advised him to treat the clergy less severely. In response, Jacob travelled to Julian's residence at the monastery of Qenneshre, where he set fire to a copy of the canon laws, criticised the patriarch for his laxity, and abdicated as archbishop of Edessa. Julian also clashed with John, archbishop of the monastery of Saint Matthew, as he had sent an archbishop to replace him upon receiving a letter from the monastery's monks that falsely stated that John had become too old and had abdicated. Eastern bishops (bishops of the former Sasanian Empire) resented Julian's actions towards John, and six bishops ordained him as archbishop of Tikrit, the highest-ranking prelate amongst the eastern bishops.

Relations between Julian and the eastern bishops remained poor after John's death on 14 January 688, and his succession by Denha on 13 March in the same year. Denha, with John of Circesium, bishop of Beth Garmai, and Joseph, bishop of the Taghlib, demanded the right to ordain suffragan bishops without the patriarch's permission, thus resurrecting the controversy over ordination rights that had predominated the tenure of the Patriarch Severus II bar Masqeh. Julian restored relations with a number of eastern bishops who opposed Denha's refusal to restore the union with the Church and with the help of the Muslim authorities had Denha brought to his residence at the monastery of Qenneshre by force. Denha was imprisoned at Qenneshre for the remainder of Julian's reign, Joseph was deposed, and Bacchus, bishop of Aqula, was made responsible for Denha's diocese in his absence.

Julian attended the consecration of the church of Saint Theodore at Nisibis with Simeon of the Olives, bishop of Harran, in 706/707. He subsequently died in 708 (AG 1019). 708 (AG 1019) as the year of Julian's death is unanimous in the sources, including the histories of Elijah of Nisibis and Michael the Syrian, the Chronicle of 846, and the Zuqnin Chronicle.

== Bibliography ==
- Burleson, Samuel; Van Rompay, Lucas (2011). "List of Patriarchs: II. The Syriac Orthodox Church and its Uniate continuations". In Sebastian P. Brock; Aaron M. Butts; George A. Kiraz; Lucas Van Rompay (eds.). Gorgias Encyclopedic Dictionary of the Syriac Heritage: Electronic Edition. Gorgias Press.
- Chabot, Jean-Baptiste, ed. (1905). Chronique de Michel le Syrien (in French). Vol. III. Paris: Ernest Leroux.
- Harrak, Amir (1999). The Chronicle of Zuqnin, Parts III and IV A.D. 488–775. Toronto: Pontifical Institute of Mediaeval Studies. ISBN 9780888442864.
- Ignatius Jacob III (2008). History of the Monastery of Saint Matthew in Mosul. Translated by Matti Moosa. Gorgias Press.
- Mazzola, Marianna, ed. (2018). Bar 'Ebroyo's Ecclesiastical History : writing Church History in the 13th century Middle East. PSL Research University.
- Mazzola, Marianna (2019). "Centralism and Local Tradition : A Reappraisal of the Sources on the Metropolis of Tagrit and Mor Matay". Le Muséon. 132 (3–4): 399–413.
- Moosa, Matti, ed. (2014). The Syriac Chronicle of Michael Rabo (the Great): A Universal History from the Creation. Beth Antioch Press.
- Morony, Michael (2005). "History and Identity in the Syrian Churches". In Jan Jacob van Ginkel; Hendrika Lena Murre-van den Berg; Theo Maarten van Lint (eds.). Redefining Christian Identity: Cultural Interaction in the Middle East Since the Rise of Islam. Peeters Publishers. pp. 1–35.
- Palmer, Andrew (1990). Monk and Mason on the Tigris Frontier: The Early History of Tur Abdin. Cambridge University Press.
- Palmer, Andrew, ed. (1993). The Seventh Century in the West Syrian Chronicles. Liverpool University Press.
- Teule, Herman G.B. (2008). "Jacob Of Edessa And Canon Law". In R.B. ter Haar Romeny (ed.). Jacob of Edessa and the Syriac Culture of His Day. Brill. pp. 83–100.
- Wilmshurst, David (2019). "West Syrian patriarchs and maphrians". In Daniel King (ed.). The Syriac World. Routledge. pp. 806–813.

Preceded by Athanasius II Baldoyo	Syriac Orthodox Patriarch of Antioch; 687-708	Succeeded by Elias I
