= Ignatius Ismail =

Syriac Orthodox Patriarch of Mardin (1333 - 1365)

- Syriac Orthodox Patriarch of Mardin
- Church: Syriac Orthodox Church
- See: Mardin
- Installed: 1333
- Term ended: 1365/1366
- Predecessor: Ignatius bar Wahib
- Successor: Ignatius Shahab

Personal details
- Died: 1365/1366

Ignatius Ismail was the Syriac Orthodox Patriarch of Mardin from 1333 until his death in 1365 or 1366. (Note: Ismail is counted as either Ignatius II as the second patriarch of Mardin by that name, or Ignatius VI.)

== Biography ==
Ismail al-Majd was the son of the deacon John of Mardin and nephew of Ignatius bar Wahib, patriarch of Mardin, and had studied church sciences under him. He later became metropolitan bishop of Amida and Hattakh with the name Iyawannis. Ismail was elected as patriarch of Mardin at a synod at the monastery of Saint Ananias and consecrated by Yuhanna Safra, metropolitan bishop of the monastery of Qartmin, in 1333, upon which he assumed the name Ignatius.

Soon after his ascension to the patriarchal office, Ismail came into conflict with the maphrian Gregory IV Matthew. The maphrian had neither been consulted nor invited in regard to the election of a new patriarch and thus refused to acknowledge Ismail as patriarch. Instead, Matthew proclaimed Michael III Yeshu as the rightful patriarch from whom he had received gifts. Ismail responded by threatening to suspend the right of the monastery of Saint Matthew near Mosul to collect donations and tithes. After four years, the dispute was resolved by the mediation of Mas'ud of Upper Ba Daniel and others and Ismail was recognised as patriarch by Matthew.

Ismail temporarily moved to the monastery of Saint Matthew near Mosul in 1358 and resided there for five months. In the same year, he was courteously received by Denha II, patriarch of the Church of the East, at Karamlesh. Ismail was forced to leave by Amir Hasan after the latter had been told that Ismail intended to transfer the monastery to the governor of Mosul.

In 1364, Ismail inadvertently instigated a schism due to his harsh treatment of Basil Saba, metropolitan bishop of Salah. After hearing criticism of Saba from a monk named George, Ismail promptly excommunicated Saba and refused to meet with him on two occasions in which he had travelled to the patriarchal residence at the monastery of Saint Ananias to appeal his excommunication. Saba's supporters resented Ismail and subsequently proclaimed Saba as patriarch of Tur Abdin and Hasankeyf on 6 August with the approval of al-Malik al-Adil Fakhr al-Din Sulayman I al-Ayyubi, Melik of Hasankeyf, in opposition to Ismail's patriarchate.

Upon receiving appeals from several dignitaries from the Nineveh Plains, including Mas'ud of Upper Ba Daniel, the presbyter John, Nur al-Din of Qaraqosh, the priest Abu Karam of Bartella, and the priest Ishaq of Basekhryei, Ismail ordained the monk Abraham from the monastery of the Cross, who had served as his secretary, as maphrian on 1 October 1364 or 1365. (Note: Abraham's accession to the maphrianate is placed either in 1364, or in 1365.) As a result of the instability that followed the collapse of the Ilkhanate, the maphrianate had lain vacant since the death of Gregory IV Matthew in 1345.

According to popular tradition, the Mhallami of Tur Abdin had converted from Christianity to Islam during Ismail's episcopate as he had forbidden them from eating food at Lent amidst food shortages and thus they had adopted Islam to avoid starvation. The historian Aphrem Barsoum argues that the tradition was likely invented by Ismail's opponents in the aftermath of the schism with the patriarchate of Tur Abdin. Ismail endeavoured to ensure the patriarchal office remained under the control of his family and as such designated his nephew Fakhr al-Dīn as his successor, who would however predecease Ismail. He served as patriarch of Mardin until his death in 1365 or 1366 and was buried at the monastery of Saint Ananias. (Note: Ismail's death is placed either in 1365, or 1366.)

== Works ==
Ismail is credited by the Maronite scholar Gabriel Cardahi with the composition of a memrā (poem) in Syriac in refutation of critics of fasting during Lent.

== Bibliography ==
- Barsoum, Aphrem (2008a). History of the Za'faran Monastery. Translated by Matti Moosa. Gorgias Press.
- Barsoum, Aphrem (2008b). The History of Tur Abdin. Translated by Matti Moosa. Gorgias Press.
- Burleson, Samuel; Van Rompay, Lucas (2011). "List of Patriarchs: II. The Syriac Orthodox Church and its Uniate continuations". In Sebastian P. Brock; Aaron M. Butts; George A. Kiraz; Lucas Van Rompay (eds.). Gorgias Encyclopedic Dictionary of the Syriac Heritage: Electronic Edition. Gorgias Press.
- Carlson, Thomas A. (2018). Christianity in Fifteenth-Century Iraq. Cambridge University Press.
- Ignatius Jacob III (2008). History of the Monastery of Saint Matthew in Mosul. Translated by Matti Moosa. Gorgias Press.
- King, Daniel, ed. (2019). The Syriac World. Routledge.
- Kiraz, George A. (2011). "Sobo, Ignatius". In Sebastian P. Brock; Aaron M. Butts; George A. Kiraz; Lucas Van Rompay (eds.). Gorgias Encyclopedic Dictionary of the Syriac Heritage: Electronic Edition. Gorgias Press.
- Mazzola, Marianna, ed. (2018). Bar 'Ebroyo's Ecclesiastical History : writing Church History in the 13th century Middle East. PSL Research University.
- Wilmshurst, David (2000). The Ecclesiastical Organisation of the Church of the East, 1318–1913. Peeters Publishers.

Preceded by Ignatius bar Wahib	Syriac Orthodox Patriarch of Mardin; 1333–1365/1366	Succeeded by Ignatius Shahab
