= Chronicle of 813 =

The Chronicle of 813 is an anonymous Syriac chronicle that covers the period from 754 until 813.

A single copy of the Chronicle survives across four partially damaged folios of the manuscript Brit. Mus. Add. MS 14642, where it immediately follows another anonymous Syriac chronicle, the Chronicle of 846. This copy is of 10th- or 11th-century date and the handwriting is poor. It is written in cursive Syriac script, and may not originally have been bound together with the other chronicle, which was copied in Esṭrangela script. It is also a palimpsest, being written over an erased Greek catena patrum. These factors make the decipherment of the text extremely difficult in places.

The Chronicle as it stands begins with the death of the Syriac Orthodox patriarch Iwannis I in October 754. The last year entry is for 811, but the latest event recorded is the death of the Abbasid caliph al-Amīn in September 813. It also records the length of the complete reign of the Byzantine emperor Michael I from 811 to 813. The last sentence, referring to an event in May 812, is cut off. Probably it referred to the total solar eclipse of May 14. These may not be the original end points of the chronicle. It almost certainly began earlier than 754. Its earlier entries may have been copied in a companion manuscript now lost. It is more likely that it originally ended in 813 (like the copy), but it is not impossible that it once extended much later.

The Chronicle of 813 is written from a Miaphysite (Syriac Orthodox) perspective. It is unrelated to the Chronicle of 846, but is related to the 12th-century world chronicle of Michael the Syrian, although it does not appear to have been a source for it. Rather, for the period covered by the Chronicle (754–813), both works largely rely on the same source. The relationship of the Chronicle of 813 to the lost chronicle of Dionysios of Tel Maḥre, which Michael is known to have used, is unclear because Dionysios completed his work in 842, long after the existing Chronicle of 813 ends. There is one known discrepancy between the Chronicle of 813 and that of Dionysios. The former places the death of the anti-patriarch John of Kallinikos in the Seleucid era 1073, while Eliya of Nisibis quotes Dionysios placing it in the Seleucid year 1074.

The Chronicle contains little that is not also in Michael, but on a few occasions more detail is given. It is considerably more detailed than the laconic Chronicle of 846. It has a strong ecclesiastical focus, although it does record famines and earthquakes. It contains a valuable description of the anarchy that engulfed Syria following the death of the caliph Hārūn al-Rashīd in 809. It is also contains important information on the growth of the Christian community in largely pagan Ḥarrān (Karrhai). It is the earliest source to mention the miracle of the cut-up lamb in the conversion of Anthony Rawḥ.

== Bibliography ==
- Brock, Sebastian (1979–80). "Syriac Historical Writing: A Survey of the Main Sources". Journal of the Iraqi Academy (Syriac Corporation). 5: 296–326 [1–30].
- Brooks, E. W. (1897). "A Syriac Chronicle of the Year 846". Zeitschrift der Deutschen Morgenländischen Gesellschaft. 51 (4): 569–588. JSTOR 43362641.
- Brooks, E. W. (1900). "A Syriac Fragment". Zeitschrift der Deutschen Morgenländischen Gesellschaft. 54 (2): 195–230. JSTOR 43366951.
- Papaconstantinou, Arietta (2012). "Saints and Saracens: On Some Miracle Accounts of the Early Arab Period". In Denis Sullivan; Elizabeth Fisher; Stratis Papaioannou (eds.). Byzantine Religious Culture: Studies in Honor of Alice-Mary Talbot. Brill. pp. 323–338. doi:10.1163/9789004226494. ISBN 9789004212442.
- Possekel, Ute (2015). "Christological Debates in Eighth-Century Harran: The Correspondence of Leo of Harran and Eliya". In M. Doerfler; E. Fiano; K. Smith (eds.). Syriac Encounters: Papers from the Sixth North American Syriac Symposium, Duke University, 26–29 June 2011. Peeters. pp. 345–366. ISBN 978-90-429-3046-9.
