= Michael II the Younger =

Antipatriarch of the Syriac Orthodox Church (1199–1215)

Mār Michael II the Younger ܡܝܟܐܝܠ ܙܥܘܪܐ
- Antipatriarch
- Native name: ܝܫܘܥ ܣܦܬܢܐ
- Church: Syriac Orthodox Church
- Province: Tagrit, Mosul, Nisibis, Mardin
- See: Antioch
- Appointed: 1200

Orders
- Ordination: 1200 by Gregorius Jacob, Maphryono of the East

Personal details
- Born: Yeshu' Saftana Melitene
- Died: 1215

Michael II the Younger (Syriac: ܡܝܟܐܝܠ ܙܥܘܪܐ, romanized: Mīkhāʾēl Zaʿurā; r. 1199–1215), also called Michael the Less, was a 13th-century claimant to the office of Syriac Orthodox Patriarch of Antioch, serving as an antipatriarch during a period of schism within the Syriac Orthodox Church.

He was called "Zaʿura" by Barhebraeus, which means "the younger", "junior", "the little", or "the less", to distinguish him from his uncle, Michael the Great.

== Biography ==
Born Joshua Sephtono (Syriac: ܝܫܘܥ ܣܦܬܢܐ, romanized: Yeshuʿ Sephtono) (Note: Ignatius Aphrem I says he was called Sephtono "because his lower lip was big".), he hailed from a prominent ecclesiastical family in Melitene, that of Michael the Syrian. His father was Abraham and his uncle was Michael the Syrian (called Rabo or "the Elder" to distinguish the two). Another uncle, Saliba, served as Archbishop of Mardin (1177) and later of Jerusalem (1184), ordained by Michael the Syrian. Joshua had a brother, Jacob (Syriac: ܝܥܩܘܒ, romanized: Yaʿqōb), who changed his name upon being elevated to his position, adopting the name Gregory (Syriac: ܓܪܝܓܘܪܝܘܣ, romanized: Grīgoryos) at his ordination as maphrian.

Joshua became a monk at Monastery of Mar Barsauma. Following the death of Patriarch Michael the Syrian in 1199, he attempted to become the patriarch of Antioch, prompting him to leave the monastery. Thus he left the monastery, but the abbot pursued him in an effort to bring him back. Joshua, in response, had him arrested by the governor of Gargar, only released on the condition that he would not hinder Michael's pursuit of the office.

=== Episcopate ===
Joshua was ordained by his brother, Maphrian Jacob, at Mor Hananyo Monastery in 1200, adopting the name Michael in honor of his uncle. As it was commonly done at the time, he appointed three bishops loyal to him in order to consolidate his support immediately after his ordination, but the people of Mardin bribed the governor to have both him and his brother expelled, to which he relocated to Melitene.

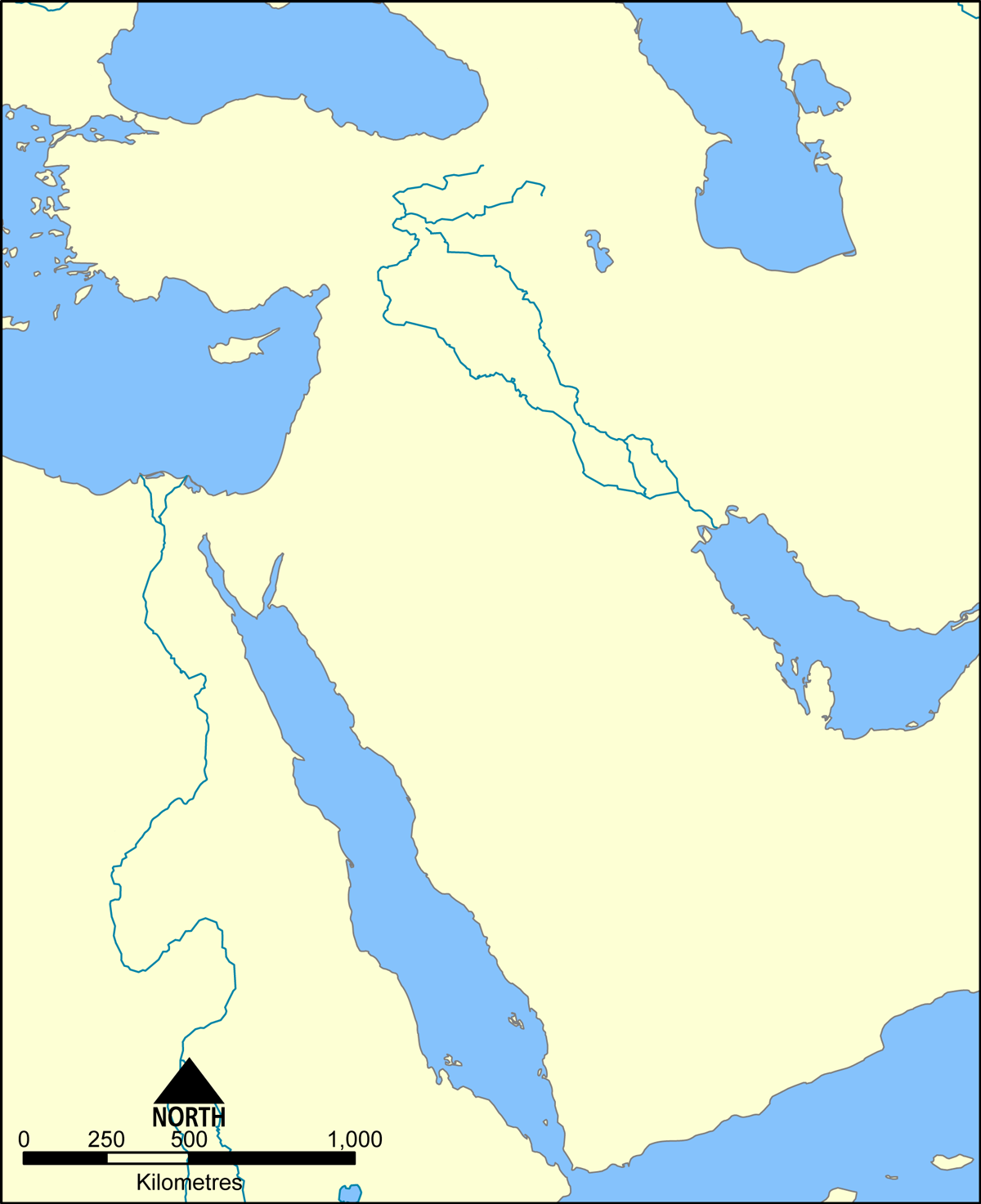
The ecclesiastical province of the Patriarch of Antioch is included in his title as "Patriarch of Antioch and the entire East"; this comprises virtually all of Asia, with a specific emphasis on the Middle East. Arabia is included, but Egypt, Armenia, and Western Anatolia are not

Thus, Michael became the antipatriarch, rival to Athanasius VIII bar Salibi, the patriarch of Antioch officially recognized by the Syriac Orthodox Church throughout the latter's entire pontificate. The anonymous author of the Chronicle of 1234 regarded Michael as the legitimate patriarch and labeled Athanasius as the antipatriarch. Athanasius was recognized in the western and northern provinces of the ecclesiastical territory of Antioch (Syria, Sultanate of Rum, and Tur Abdin) while Michael was recognized in the eastern and southern provinces (Tagrit, Mosul, Nisibis, and Mardin). Both clergymen wielded their financial and influential resources to assert their legitimacy; Athanasius accused Michael of bribing Sultan Rukn al-Din of Melitene with six thousand dinars, despite the prohibition against monks owning any money.

Athanasius died in 1207, and John XII of Antioch was ordained as his successor; Michael, however continued to contest John, and the schism persisted. According to Barhebraeus, Michael never gained significant popular support even within his own family, with the notable exception of his brother, Maphrian Jacob, who remained loyal to him.

Michael died 40 days after his brother in 1215, leading to the eventual resolution of the schism.

== Works ==
Despite the trouble he caused, Michael was a learned and chaste man who composed several books:

- On the Annunciation in 21 chapters
- On Christmas in 125 chapters; fragments of this exist in Tur Abdin at the Sharfeh Monastery
- On Christ's Entry into Jerusalem in 25 chapters
- On Lent and Maundy Thursday in 16 chapters
- On Good Friday in 15 chapters, which includes a homily on the Washing of Feet; a copy is in Paris, France

He also composed a long liturgy that starts with the phrase "O Lord, Who art the master of all and the first righteous who has no equal".

== See also ==
- Isaac I of Antioch
- Athanasius Sandalaya
- Ignatius Aphrem II
- Mor Gabriel Monastery
- Church of the East
- Schism of 1552

== Bibliography ==
- Witakowski, Witold (2011). Brock, Sebastian P.; Butts, Aaron Michael; Kiraz, George A.; Rompay, Lucas Van (eds.). Gorgias Encyclopedic Dictionary of the Syriac Heritage. Gorgias Press, LLC. ISBN 9781593337148.
- Barsoum, Ignatius Aphram (2003). The Scattered Pearls: A History of Syriac Literature and Sciences. Translated by Moosa, Matti (Second rev. ed.). Piscataway (N. J.): Gorgias Press, LLC. ISBN 1-931956-04-9.
- Matarasso, Omri (2024). "The Syriac Orthodox Church in the Time of the Syriac Renaissance". Church History. 93 (1). doi:10.1017/S0009640724000295. ISSN 0009-6407 – via Cambridge University Press.
- Witakowski, Witold (2007-11-01). "Syriac Historiographical Sources". In Whitby, Mary (ed.). Byzantines and Crusaders in Non-Greek Sources, 1025-1204. British Academy. doi:10.5871/bacad/9780197263785.003.0011. ISBN 978-0-19-726378-5.
- Kawerau, Peter (1955). Die jakobitische Kirche im Zeitalter der syrischen Renaissance (in German). De Gruyter. doi:10.1515/9783112470602. ISBN 978-3-11-247060-2.
- Wright, William (1894). A Short History of Syriac Literature. Adam and Charles Black. ISBN 978-0-8370-7679-9.
- Wilmshurst, David (2019). "West Syrian Patriarchs and Maphrians, 806–813". In King, Daniel (ed.). The Syriac World. Routledge. ISBN 9780367732363.
