= List of Syriac Orthodox patriarchs of Antioch =

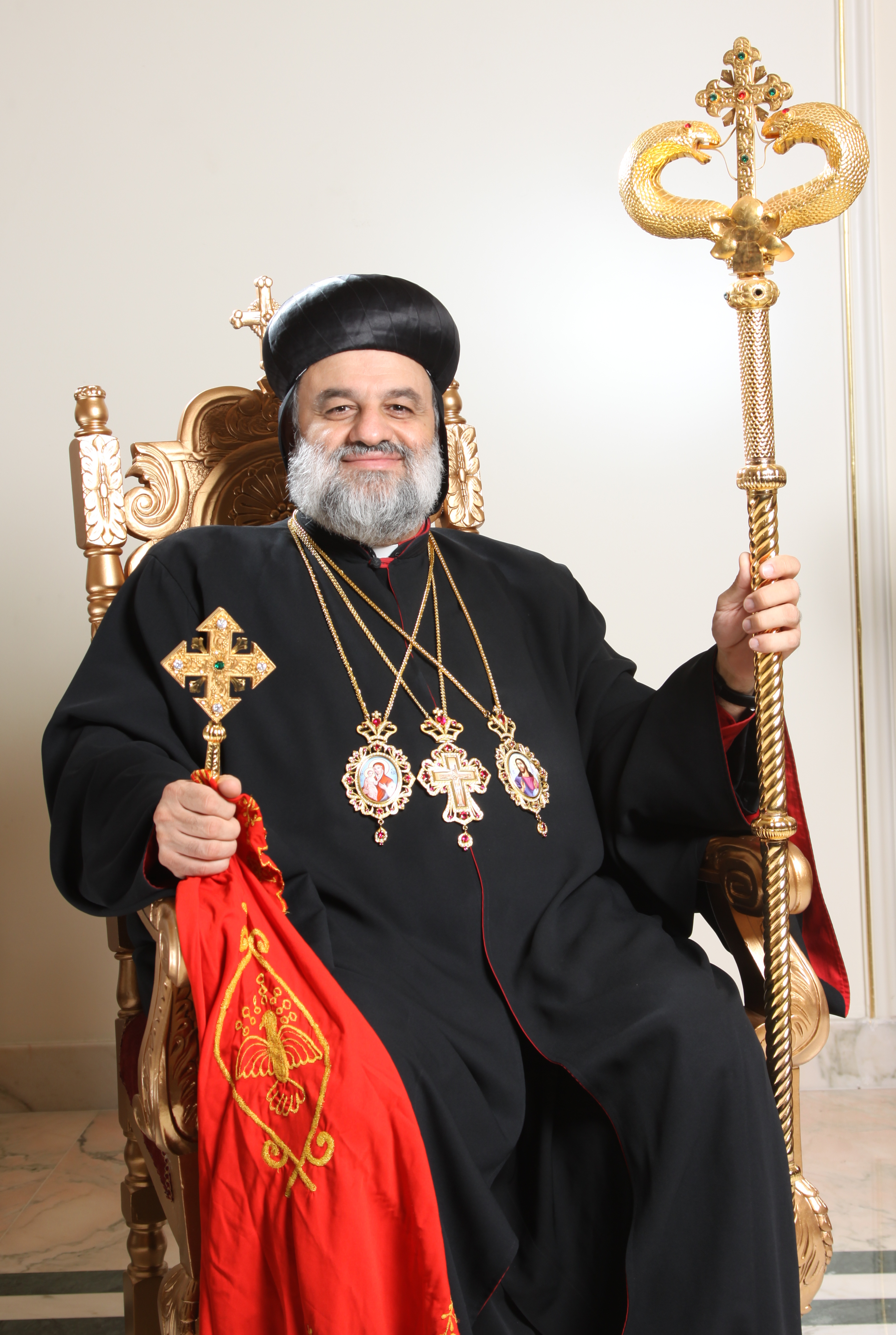
Current Patriarch of Antioch, Ignatius Aphrem II

The Syriac Orthodox patriarch of Antioch and All the East is the head of the Syriac Orthodox Church. According to tradition, the patriarchate of Antioch was established by Saint Peter in the 1st century AD, but split into two separate lines of patriarchs after the deposition of Patriarch Severus of Antioch in 518 over the issue of the Council of Chalcedon of 451. The non-Chalcedonian supporters of Severus went on to form what is now known as the Syriac Orthodox Church, whilst the Chalcedonians developed the church now known as the Greek Orthodox Church of Antioch.

The Syriac Orthodox Church underwent schism in the medieval era, first, after the death of Patriarch Philoxenus I Nemrud in 1292 with the formation of separate patriarchates of Mardin and Melitene, and again in 1364 due to the emergence of a patriarchate of Tur Abdin. Unity was restored to the church gradually as the patriarchate at Melitene came to an end in 1293, and the patriarchate of Mardin lapsed after its patriarch Ignatius Behnam Hadloyo was acknowledged as patriarch of Antioch in 1445. A line of patriarchs in communion with the Catholic Church split permanently in 1782, and thus formed the Syriac Catholic Church.

The current patriarch of Antioch of the Syriac Orthodox Church is Ignatius Aphrem II.

== List of patriarchs ==
=== Syriac patriarchs from 512 to 1292 ===
Unless otherwise stated, all information is from the Gorgias Encyclopedic Dictionary of the Syriac Heritage and the list provided in The Syriac World as noted in the bibliography below. Numeration includes incumbents deemed legitimate by the Syriac Orthodox Church prior to the schism in 518.

37. Severus I (512–538) (Note: Severus was deposed in 518 by Emperor Justin I, but continued to be recognised as patriarch by non-Chalcedonians until his death in 538.)
38. vacant (538–c. 544/557)
39. Sergius of Tella (c. 544–c. 547 or c. 557–560) (Note: According to the Zuqnin Chronicle, Sergius reigned in c. 544–c. 547, whereas John of Ephesus places his reign in c. 557–560.)
  vacant (c. 547–c. 551 or 560–564)
40. Paul II (c. 551/564–578) (Note: According to the Zuqnin Chronicle, Paul became patriarch in c. 551, whereas John of Ephesus dates the beginning of his reign to 564. Paul was deposed in 578 by Pope Peter IV of Alexandria, but continued to be recognised as patriarch by his supporters until his death in 581.)
  vacant (578–581) (Note: Peter III may have become patriarch in 578, and thus no vacancy may have taken place.)
41. Peter III (578/581–591) (Note: Peter III became patriarch in either the same year as the deposition of Paul II in 578 or after his death in 581.)
42. Julian II (591–594) (Note: Julian is counted as either Julian I as the first Syriac Orthodox Patriarch of Antioch by that name, or Julian II, after Julian (r. 471–475/476).)
  vacant (594–603) (Note: Athanasius I may have become patriarch in 594, and thus no vacancy may have taken place.)
43. Athanasius I Gammolo (594/595/603–631) (Note: According to Michael the Syrian, Athanasius became patriarch in 594/595, whereas Jacob of Edessa dates the beginning of his reign to 603.)
44. John III (631–648) (Note: John is counted as either John I, as the first Syriac Orthodox Patriarch of Antioch by that name, John II, or John III.)
45. Theodore (649–666/667)
46. Severus II bar Masqeh (667/668–680/684) (Note: The end of Severus' reign is placed either at his deposition in 680, or at his death in 684.)
  vacant (680–684) (Note: The patriarchal office is only considered vacant at this time if Severus II is not acknowledged as the patriarch after his deposition in 680.)
47. Athanasius II Baldoyo (683/684–687)
48. Julian III (687–707/708) (Note: Julian is also counted as Julian II as the second Syriac Orthodox Patriarch of Antioch by that name.)
49. Elias I (709–723/724)
50. Athanasius III (724–739/740)
51. Iwannis I (739/740–754/755) (Note: Iwannis is also counted as John III.)
  Isaac I (755–756) (Note: Isaac is regarded as an illegitimate patriarch.)
  Athanasius Sandalaya (756–758) (Note: Athanasius is considered either semi-legitimate, and counted as Athanasius IV, or wholly illegitimate.)
52. George I (758/759–789/790)
  John of Raqqa (758–762) (Note: John of Raqqa is considered an illegitimate patriarch.)
  David of Dara (762–774) (Note: David of Dara is considered an illegitimate patriarch.)
53. Joseph (790–791/792)
54. Quriaqos of Tagrit (793–817)
  Abraham (807/808–837) (Note: Abraham is considered an illegitimate patriarch.)
55. Dionysius I Telmaharoyo (818–845)
  Simeon (c. 837) (Note: Simeon is considered an illegitimate patriarch.)
56. John IV (846/847–873/874) (Note: John is also counted as John III.)
  vacant (874–878)
57. Ignatius II (878–883) (Note: Ignatius is either counted as Ignatius I as the first Syriac Orthodox Patriarch of Antioch by that name, or Ignatius II, after Ignatius (r. c. 70 – c. 107).)
  vacant (883–887)
58. Theodosius Romanus (887–896)
  vacant (896–897) (Note: Dionysius II may have become patriarch in 896, and thus no vacancy may have taken place.)
59. Dionysius II (896/897–908/909)
60. John V (910–922) (Note: John is also counted as John IV.)
61. Basil I (923–935)
62. John VI (936–953)
63. Iwannis II (954–957) (Note: Iwannis is also counted as John VI or John VII.)
64. Dionysius III (958–961)
65. Abraham I (962–963)
  vacant (963–965)
66. John VII Sarigta (965–985) (Note: John is also counted as John VI.)
67. Athanasius IV Salhoyo (986/987–1002/1003) (Note: Athanasius is also counted as Athanasius V, after Athanasius Sandalaya.)
68. John VIII bar Abdoun (1004–1030/1031/1033) (Note: John is also counted as John VII.)
69. Dionysius IV Yahyo (1031–1042)
  vacant (1042–1049) (Note: John IX bar ʿAbdun may have become patriarch in 1042, and thus no vacancy may have taken place.)
70. John IX bar ʿAbdun (1042/1048/1049–1057)
71. Athanasius V Yahyo (1057/1058–1062/1064) (Note: Athanasius is also counted as Athanasius VI.)
72. John X bar Shushan (1063/1064–1072/1073) (Note: John is also counted as John VIII, after John bar Abdun (r. 1004–1030) or John IX, after John bar Abdun (r. 1049–1057).)
73. Basil II (1074–1075) (Note: Basil is also counted as Basil III.)
  John bar ʿAbdun (1075–1076/1077) (Note: John is counted as John IX, John X, or John XI.)
74. Dionysius V Lazarus (1077–1078/1079)
  vacant (1078/1079–86)
75. Iwannis III (1086–1087/1088)
76. Dionysius VI (1088–1090)
77. Athanasius VI bar Khamoro (1090/1091–1129) (Note: Athanasius is also counted as Athanasius VII.)
78. John XI bar Mawdyono (1129/1130–1137) (Note: John is also counted as John X, John XII, and John XIII.)
79. Athanasius VII bar Qatra (1138/1139–1166) (Note: Athanasius is also counted as Athanasius VI.)
80. Michael I (1166–1199)
  Theodore bar Wahbun (1180–1193) (Note: Theodore bar Wahbun is considered an illegitimate patriarch.)
81. Athanasius VIII bar Salibi (1199–1207) (Note: Athanasius is also counted as Athanasius VII and Athanasius IX.)
  Michael II the Younger (1199/1200–1215) (Note: Michael II the Younger is considered an illegitimate patriarch.)
82. John XII (1207/1208–1219/1220) (Note: John is counted as John XI, John XIII, or John XIV.)
  vacant (1220–1222)
83. Ignatius III David (1222–1252)
  Dionysius VII ʿAngur (1252–1261)
84. John XIII bar Ma'dani (1252–1263) (Note: John bar Ma'dani was consecrated as patriarch after Dionysius VII, and both claimed the patriarchal office simultaneously until Dionysius' death in 1261, after which John was recognised as the sole patriarch.)
85. Ignatius IV Yeshu (1264–1282/1283)
86. Philoxenus I Nemrud (1283–1292)

=== Syriac Orthodox patriarchs from 1292 to 1445 ===
On the death of Patriarch Philoxenus I Nemrud in 1292, the Syriac Orthodox Church split into the patriarchates of Antioch, Mardin, and Melitene. A separate patriarchate of Tur Abdin broke off from the patriarchate of Mardin in 1364. The patriarchate of Melitene ended in 1293, and the patriarch of Mardin Ignatius Behnam Hadloyo was acknowledged as the patriarch of Antioch in 1445, thus ending the schism.

Patriarchate of Antioch

86. Michael II (1292–1312) (Note: Michael is counted as either Michael I as the first patriarch by that name in this line, Michael II after Michael I (r. 1166–1199), or Michael III after Michael II the Younger (r. 1199–1215).)
87. Michael III Yeshu (1313–1349) (Note: Michael is also counted as Michael II as the second patriarch by that name in this line, and Michael IV.)
88. Basil III Gabriel (1349–1387)
89. Philoxenus II (1387–c. 1421)
90. Basil IV Simon (1421/1422–1444/1445)

Patriarchate of Mardin

- Ignatius bar Wahib (1293–1333) (Note: Ignatius bar Wahib is counted as either Ignatius I as the first patriarch of Mardin by that name, or Ignatius V, after Ignatius IV Yeshu (r. 1264–1283).)
- Ignatius Ismail (1333–1365/1366) (Note: Ismail is counted as either Ignatius II, or Ignatius VI.)
- Ignatius Shahab (1365/1366–1381) (Note: Shahab is counted as either Ignatius III, or Ignatius VII.)
- Ignatius Abraham bar Garib (1382–1412) (Note: Abraham is counted as either Abraham II, Ignatius II, Ignatius IV, or Ignatius VIII.)
- Ignatius Behnam Hadloyo (1412–1445) (Note: Behnam is counted as either Ignatius V, or Ignatius IX. Patriarch of Antioch from 1445 to 1455.)

Patriarchate of Melitene

- Ignatius Constantine (1292–1293)

Patriarchate of Tur Abdin (1364–1840)

=== Syriac Orthodox patriarchs from 1445 to 1782 ===
91. Ignatius Behnam Hadloyo (1445–1455)
92. Ignatius Khalaf Maʿdnoyo (1455/1456–84) (Note: Khalaf is counted as either Ignatius VI, or Ignatius X.)
93. Ignatius John XIV (1484–1493) (Note: John is also counted as Ignatius X.)
94. Ignatius Noah of Lebanon (1493/1494–1509)
95. Ignatius Yeshu I (1509–1510/1519) (Note: Yeshu is also counted as Yeshu III.)
96. Ignatius Jacob I (1510/1512–1517/1519) (Note: Jacob's ascension is placed either in 1510, or 1512.)
  Athanasius bar Subay (1511–between 1514 and 1518) (Note: Athanasius bar Subay is regarded as an illegitimate patriarch.)
97. Ignatius David I (1519–1521) (Note: David is also counted as David II.)
98. Ignatius Abdullah I (1521–1557)
99. Ignatius Ni'matallah (1557–1576) (Note: Ni'matallah is counted as Ignatius XVII.)
100. Ignatius David II Shah (1576–1591)
101. Ignatius Pilate (1591–1597)
102. Ignatius Hidayat Allah (1597/1598–1639/1640)
103. Ignatius Simon (1640–1653)
  Ignatius Shukrallah I (1640–1670) (Note: Shukrallah is regarded as an illegitimate patriarch.)
104. Ignatius Yeshu II (1653/1655–1661) (Note: Yeshu is also counted as Yeshu IV.)
105. Ignatius Abdulmasih I (1661/1662–1686)
106. Ignatius George II (1687–1708)
107. Ignatius Isaac II (1709–1722)
108. Ignatius Shukrallah II (1722/1723–1745)
109. Ignatius George III (1745/1746–1768)
110. Ignatius George IV (1768–1781)

=== Syriac Orthodox patriarchs from 1782 to present ===
111. Ignatius Matthew (1782–1817)
112. Ignatius Yunan (1817–1818)
113. Ignatius George V (1819–1836) (Note: The patriarchate of Ignatius George V is placed in either 1819–1836, or 1819–1839.)
  vacant (1836–1838)
114. Ignatius Elias II (1838–1847) (Note: The patriarchate of Ignatius Elias II is placed in either 1838–1847, or 1839–1847.)
115. Ignatius Jacob II (1847–1871)
116. Ignatius Peter IV (1872–1894) (Note: Peter is also counted as Peter III, and Peter VII.)
117. Ignatius Abdulmasih II (1894/1895–1903) (Note: Abdulmasih was deposed in 1903, but continued to be recognised as patriarch by his supporters until his death in 1915.)
118. Ignatius Abdullah II (1906–1915)
  vacant (1915–1917)
119. Ignatius Elias III (1917–1932)
120. Ignatius Aphrem I (1933–1957)
121. Ignatius Jacob III (1957–1980)
122. Ignatius Zakka I (1980–2014)
123. Ignatius Aphrem II (2014–present)

== See also ==
- Patriarch of Tur Abdin
- Catholicos of India

== Bibliography ==
- Barsoum, Aphrem (2003). The Scattered Pearls: A History of Syriac Literature and Sciences. Translated by Matti Moosa (2nd ed.). Gorgias Press.
- Barsoum, Aphrem (2008). History of the Za'faran Monastery. Translated by Matti Moosa. Gorgias Press.
- Barsoum, Aphrem (2009). The Collected Historical Essays of Aphram I Barsoum. Vol. 1. Translated by Matti Moosa. Gorgias Press.
- Bataille, André (1955). Traité d'études byzantines. Vol. 1. Presses universitaires de France.
- Burleson, Samuel; Van Rompay, Lucas (2011). "List of Patriarchs: II. The Syriac Orthodox Church and its Uniate continuations". In Sebastian P. Brock; Aaron M. Butts; George A. Kiraz; Lucas Van Rompay (eds.). Gorgias Encyclopedic Dictionary of the Syriac Heritage: Electronic Edition. Gorgias Press.
- Carlson, Thomas A. (2018). Christianity in Fifteenth-Century Iraq (PDF). Cambridge University Press.
- Dinno, Khalid S. (2017). The Syrian Orthodox Christians in the Late Ottoman Period and Beyond: Crisis then Revival. Gorgias Press.
- Ignatius Jacob III (2008). History of the Monastery of Saint Matthew in Mosul. Translated by Matti Moosa. Gorgias Press.
- Kiraz, George A. (2011). "ʿAbdulmasīḥ II". In Sebastian P. Brock; Aaron M. Butts; George A. Kiraz; Lucas Van Rompay (eds.). Gorgias Encyclopedic Dictionary of the Syriac Heritage: Electronic Edition. Gorgias Press.
- Palmer, Andrew (1990). Monk and Mason on the Tigris Frontier: The Early History of Tur Abdin. Cambridge University Press.
- Palmer, Andrew (1993). The Seventh Century in the West Syrian Chronicles. Liverpool University Press.
- Salvadore, Matteo (2017). "African Cosmopolitanism in the Early Modern Mediterranean: The Diasporic Life of Yohannes, the Ethiopian Pilgrim Who Became a Counter-Reformation Bishop". Journal of African History. 58 (1). Cambridge University Press: 61–83. doi:10.1017/S002185371600058X. S2CID 164524442.
- Van Rompay, Lucas (2011a). "Pawlos of Beth Ukome". In Sebastian P. Brock; Aaron M. Butts; George A. Kiraz; Lucas Van Rompay (eds.). Gorgias Encyclopedic Dictionary of the Syriac Heritage: Electronic Edition. Gorgias Press.
- Van Rompay, Lucas (2011b). "Severos bar Mashqo". In Sebastian P. Brock; Aaron M. Butts; George A. Kiraz; Lucas Van Rompay (eds.). Gorgias Encyclopedic Dictionary of the Syriac Heritage: Electronic Edition. Gorgias Press.
- Wilmshurst, David (2019). "West Syrian patriarchs and maphrians". In Daniel King (ed.). The Syriac World. Routledge. pp. 806–813.
