= André de Halleux =

Belgian Franciscan and professor

André de Halleux (1929–1994) was a Belgian Franciscan (ordained 1953), and professor at the University of Louvain at the Theological Faculty (Patristics, theology of Eastern Churches, ecumenical movement, history of dogma) and at the Oriental Institute (Syriac language and literature).

Born 18 January 1929 in La Roche-en-Ardenne, he was a corresponding member of the Belgian Academy (1993), a specialist in Syriac literature, in the Council of Chalcedon (451) and its consequences, particularly in the Nestorian and Monophysite spheres (due to his early research on Sahdona and on Philoxenus of Mabbôg). He was awarded with the honorary doctorate of the Institut catholique de Paris, and of the Pontificio Istituto Orientale, Rome.

De Halleux was actively involved in oecumenical dialogue, was appointed a consultor to the Pontifical Secretariat for Christian Unity in 1974, and took part in the Vienna 'Pro Oriente' colloquia. After the death of René Draguet, his Syriac teacher, de Halleux became the de facto editor of the Corpus Scriptorum Christianorum Orientalium for 16 years.

He died 30 January 1994 in Uccle, Brussels.

== Selected works ==
- Philoxène de Mabbog: sa vie, ses écrits, sa théologie, Leuven, 1963
- Patrologie et Ecumenisme: Recueil d'Etudes. Leuven: University Press and Peeters, 1990.
- Halleux, André de (1992). "The Catholicity of the local church in the Patriarchate of Antioch after Chalcedon". The Jurist. 52: 109–129.

Edition and translation:

- Martyrius (Sahdona). Oeuvres spirituelles (CSCO 200-201, 214-215, 252-253, 254-255), Leuven 1960, 1961, 1965.
- Philoxène de Mabbog. Lettres aux moines de Senoun (CSCO 231-232), Leuven 1963.

== Sources ==
- Jacques Ryckmans and Lucas van Rompay, Notice André de Halleux on the Royal Academy of Belgium website
- Tanios Bou Mansour, 'apport du Professeur André de Halleux aux études syriaques. Un premier sondage, Parole de l’Orient 20 (1995) 5-39.
- Jean-Marie Sevrin, André de Halleux (1929-1994), Revue théologique de Louvain 25 (1994) 425-428.
- Pierre Duprey, Le Père André de Halleux et le service de l’unité, Revue théologique de Louvain 25 (1994) 429-432
- Sebastian Brock (1994). "La contribution du Professeur André de Halleux aux études syriaques". Revue théologique de Louvain. 25 (in French). 25 (4): 433–437. doi:10.3406/thlou.1994.2725. OCLC 928564932.
- G. Van Belle, In Memoriam André de Halleux, Ephemerides theologicae Lovanienses 70 (1994) 235-243 (with bibliography)
