= Ignatius bar Wahib =

Syriac Orthodox patriach of Mardin (1293 - 1333)

- Syriac Orthodox Patriarch of Mardin
- Church: Syriac Orthodox Church
- See: Mardin
- Installed: 1293
- Term ended: 1333
- Predecessor: Office created
- Successor: Ignatius Ismail

Personal details
- Born: Joseph Badr al-Din Zakhi bar Wahib Korinsha

Ignatius bar Wahib (Note: He is counted as either Ignatius I as the first patriarch of Mardin by that name, or Ignatius V, after Ignatius IV Yeshu (r. 1264–1283). Alternatively transliterated as bar Wuhayb.) (Syriac: ܒܪ ܘܗܝܒ, Arabic: ابن ُوهيب) was the Syriac Orthodox Patriarch of Mardin from 1293 until his death in 1333.

== Biography ==
Joseph Badr al-Din Zakhi bar Wahib was born at Korinsha in the Tur Abdin in the 13th century, and was the son of Abraham. He was raised at Mardin, and became a monk at the nearby monastery of Saint Ananias. Patriarch Philoxenus I Nemrud consecrated bar Wahib as archbishop of Mardin in 1287, upon which he assumed the name Ignatius.

He was elected as the patriarch of Mardin at a synod at the monastery of Saint Ananias at the beginning of January 1293, and was consecrated by Ignatius, archbishop of Qartmin. In 1303 or 1304, he convened a synod at the monastery of Saint Ananias, in which he issued ten canons, and was attended by five bishops. He was credited with performing three miracles at Mardin that were reportedly recognised by both Christians and Muslims. Bar Wahib served as patriarch of Mardin until his death in 1333. As patriarch, Bar Wahib ordained twenty bishops.

== Works ==
Bar Wahib wrote two books on Syriac and Arabic phonetics, and a liturgy in 1304. As well as this, he wrote a treatise on the definition of prayers and rituals.

== Bibliography ==
- Barsoum, Aphrem (2003). The Scattered Pearls: A History of Syriac Literature and Sciences. Translated by Matti Moosa (2nd ed.). Gorgias Press.
- Barsoum, Aphrem (2008). History of the Za'faran Monastery. Translated by Matti Moosa. Gorgias Press.
- Barsoum, Aphrem (2009). The Collected Historical Essays of Aphram I Barsoum. Vol. 1. Translated by Matti Moosa. Gorgias Press.
- Burleson, Samuel; Van Rompay, Lucas (2011). "List of Patriarchs: II. The Syriac Orthodox Church and its Uniate continuations". In Sebastian P. Brock; Aaron M. Butts; George A. Kiraz; Lucas Van Rompay (eds.). Gorgias Encyclopedic Dictionary of the Syriac Heritage: Electronic Edition. Gorgias Press.

| Preceded by Office created | Syriac Orthodox Patriarch of Mardin; 1293-1333 | Succeeded by Ignatius Ismail |
