= Isaac I of Antioch =

Isaac I
- Syriac Orthodox Patriarch of Antioch and All the East
- Church: Syriac Orthodox Church
- See: Antioch
- Installed: 755
- Term ended: 756
- Predecessor: Iwannis I
- Successor: Athanasius Sandalaya

Personal details
- Died: 756

Isaac I was the Patriarch of Antioch and head of the Syriac Orthodox Church from 755 until his death in 756. Isaac's uncanonical elevation to the patriarchal office has led him to be regarded as an illegitimate patriarch.

== Biography ==
Isaac was a monk at the monastery of Qartmin, and was later ordained as bishop of Harran by Athanasius Sandalaya in 752. The historian Dionysius of Tel Mahre, whose work survives in the Chronicle of Michael the Syrian, claimed that Isaac had become friends with Athanasius Sandalaya and received the bishopric of Harran as he possessed an elixir that could transmute lead into gold that he had taken from a visiting monk he had murdered whilst residing at the monastery of Purqsa near Edessa. Iwannis' appointment to the see of Harran, which was achieved without patriarchal approval, took place amidst the controversy between Athanasius Sandalaya and the Patriarch Iwannis I, by which point the former had gained the upper hand with the support of Abdallah, the Caliph As-Saffah's brother.

Abdallah also lent his support to Isaac, and after he had succeeded his brother as caliph as Al-Mansur, he instructed bishops to attend a synod at Reshʿayna and elect Isaac as patriarch in 755 (AG 1066). Isaac was ordained by Jacob, bishop of Rish Kifa, and was awarded a decree from the caliph that authorised him to perform patriarchal duties. Whereas the historian Dionysius of Tel Mahre asserted that the Caliph Al-Mansur had appointed Isaac as patriarch so to empower him to gather the alchemical ingredients necessary to make more of the elixir, the History of the Patriarchs of Alexandria alternatively recorded that Isaac had received the caliph's favour and the patriarchal office as the caliph's childless wife had conceived and given birth to two children after receiving Isaac's prayers and blessing.

Upon his ascension to the patriarchal office, Isaac faced opposition from two archbishops who had declared his elevation as uncanonical and excommunicated Isaac, to which he responded with an appeal to the caliph and had the two archbishops executed. Isaac attempted to secure recognition from Pope Michael I of Alexandria, and sent a delegation of a priest, a deacon, and the archbishops of Damascus and of Emesa with a synodal letter and gifts to achieve this purpose. With the caliph's approval, he also sent a letter to Abu Awn Abd al-Malik ibn Yazid, the wali (governor) of Egypt, to instruct him to send Michael to the caliph if the pope refused to acknowledge Isaac. Meanwhile, whilst Michael convened a synod and deliberated with his bishops on the issue of Isaac's legitimacy, Isaac made his residence at Edessa, and attempted to procure alchemical ingredients for the elixir.

Isaac's tenure as patriarch was doomed from the onset as, although he possessed the elixir he had taken from the monk he had murdered, Isaac lacked the elixir's formula, and thus offered no results to the caliph upon appearing before his summons. Therefore, in 756 (AG 1067), the caliph had Isaac strangled to death at Aqula, and his body was thrown into the Euphrates. He was later commemorated as a saint in the Martyrology of Rabban Sliba likely because he, like the martyrology's author, was a monk of Qartmin, however, Isaac is not regarded as a saint or a legitimate patriarch by official Syriac Orthodox histories.

== Bibliography ==
- Evetts, Basil Thomas Alfred, ed. (1904). History of the Patriarchs of the Coptic Church of Alexandria. Vol. III. Beth Mardutho.
- Fiey, Jean Maurice (2004). Lawrence Conrad (ed.). Saints Syriaques (in French). The Darwin Press.
- Harrak, Amir (1999). The Chronicle of Zuqnin, Parts III and IV A.D. 488–775. Toronto: Pontifical Institute of Mediaeval Studies. ISBN 9780888442864.
- Mazzola, Marianna, ed. (2018). Bar 'Ebroyo's Ecclesiastical History : writing Church History in the 13th century Middle East. PSL Research University.
- Moosa, Matti, ed. (2014). The Syriac Chronicle of Michael Rabo (the Great): A Universal History from the Creation. Beth Antioch Press.
- Palmer, Andrew (1990). Monk and Mason on the Tigris Frontier: The Early History of Tur Abdin. Cambridge University Press.
- Wilmshurst, David (2019). "West Syrian patriarchs and maphrians". In Daniel King (ed.). The Syriac World. Routledge. pp. 806–813.

Preceded by Iwannis I	Syriac Orthodox Patriarch of Antioch; 755–756	Succeeded by Athanasius Sandalaya
