= Athanasius Sandalaya =

Patriarch of Antioch

- Syriac Orthodox Patriarch of Antioch and All the East
- Church: Syriac Orthodox Church
- See: Antioch
- Installed: 756
- Term ended: 758
- Predecessor: Iwannis I
- Successor: George I
- Previous post: Metropolitan of Mesopotamia

Athanasius Sandalaya, also known as Athanasius Sandloyo or al-Sandali, was the Patriarch of Antioch, and head of the Syriac Orthodox Church from 756 until 758.

== Biography ==
Originally a monk at the Monastery of Qartmin, Athanasius became Bishop of Maiperqat, a bishopric subordinate to the Metropolitan Bishop of Amid. During his tenure as bishop, Athanasius is known to have used church funds to obtain the support of the Caliph Marwan II to strengthen his position. By 742/743, Athanasius had been granted the title of Metropolitan of Mesopotamia, potentially due to the simultaneous growth and decline of Maiperqat and Amid respectively, as well as the decrepitude of Severus, Bishop of Amid.

As metropolitan, Athanasius granted his student Isaiah of Ashparin administrative control of the greater part of the diocese of Amid as a result of Severus' inability to lead the diocese. During the late 740s, however, this appointment caused Athanasius to come into conflict with the patriarch Iwannis I who ordained a certain Abay, former Bishop of Arzun, as the new bishop of Amid. This conflict was exacerbated by Iwannis' failure to ordain Dionysius, Athanasius' appointment to the empty see of Tur Abdin, after the death of its former incumbent Athanasius of Nunib.

At the Synod of Tella in 752, Athanasius expanded his authority as metropolitan from the area of the former Roman province of Mesopotamia to the entirety of Upper Mesopotamia through the use of implicit threats of reprisals from the Muslim authorities, despite the protests of the bishops. Athanasius commemorated his success with the erection of a new cathedral in the city of Maiperqat. He later used his new authority to ordain his student Iwannis Isaac as Bishop of Harran and depose the bishops of Samosata and Singara. Athanasius also succeeded in having Iwannis Isaac ordained as the patriarch and successor to Iwannis I in 754. Daniel, son of Moses of Tur Abdin, later claimed that Athanasius secured Iwannis' elevation to the patriarchal office by organising the election fraudulently. Athanasius succeeded Iwannis in 756 and served as patriarch until 758.

== Bibliography ==
- Palmer, Andrew (1990). Monk and Mason on the Tigris Frontier: The Early History of Tur 'Abdin. Cambridge University Press. ISBN 9780521360265.

Preceded by Isaac I	Syriac Orthodox Patriarch of Antioch; 756-758	Succeeded by George I
