= Zuqnin Monastery =

Former Syriac Orthodox monastery in Turkey

Zuqnīn Monastery was a Syriac Orthodox monastery near Diyarbakır in Turkey. (Note: (Arabic: دير زوقنين, Syriac: ܕܝܪܐ ܕܙܘܩܢ̈ܝܢ). Also known as Saint John's Monastery.) It produced one patriarch and fourteen bishops.

== History ==
The Zuqnīn Monastery was founded in the fourth century and had become a centre of learning by the middle of the century. The hagiography of Saint Matthew the Hermit attests that he had been a monk at the monastery, by which point it had become known for its library and teachers, some time prior to the persecutions of the Roman Emperor Julian (r. 361–363). In John of Ephesus' Lives of the Eastern Saints, it is recorded that the monastery was gifted with half of the village of Nardo in Ingilene by the prior of the nearby Monastery of Mar Yoḥannan Urṭaya after having been endowed with the village by imperial decree, likely by Emperor Zeno, in the latter part of the fifth century. It has been suggested that the Zuqnīn Monastery could be identified with the monastery of Tella-d-tūthē ("hill of the sycamore" in Syriac), where miaphysite monks from nearby monasteries took refuge during the persecutions of Ephraim of Antioch in the sixth century.

Matthew, metropolitan bishop of Aleppo, (fl. 669), Theodotus of Amida (d. 698), and Thomas, metropolitan bishop of Amida, (d. c. 700) are noted as former monks of the monastery. According to the Ecclesiastical History of Bar Hebraeus, the Patriarch Iwannis I (r. 739/740–754/755) had been a monk at the Zuqnīn Monastery. Forty-two monks died from disease at the monastery in 750/751 (AG 1062). The Zuqnin Chronicle was written by a monk at the Zuqnīn Monastery during the reign of Caliph al-Mansur (r. 754–775). It was abandoned in the tenth century.

== Bibliography ==
- Barsoum, Aphrem (2003). The Scattered Pearls: A History of Syriac Literature and Sciences. Translated by Matti Moosa (2nd ed.). Gorgias Press.
- Harrak, Amir (1999). The Chronicle of Zuqnin, Parts III and IV A.D. 488–775. Toronto: Pontifical Institute of Mediaeval Studies. ISBN 9780888442864.
- Ignatius Jacob III (2008). History of the Monastery of Saint Matthew in Mosul. Translated by Matti Moosa. Gorgias Press.
- Keser-Kayaalp, Elif (2013). "The Church of Virgin at Amida and the martyrium at Constantia: Two Monumental Centralised Churches in Late Antique Northern Mesopotamia". Olba (21): 405–435.
- Mazzola, Marianna, ed. (2018). Bar 'Ebroyo's Ecclesiastical History : writing Church History in the 13th century Middle East. PSL Research University.
- Palmer, Andrew (1990). Monk and Mason on the Tigris Frontier: The Early History of Tur Abdin. Cambridge University Press.
- Wipszycka, Ewa (2020). "The economy of Syrian monasteries (fifth-eighth century)" (PDF). Journal of Juristic Papyrology (19): 179–259.
