= Athanasius III (Syriac Orthodox patriarch of Antioch) =

49th Patriarch of Syriac Orthodox Church of Antioch

- Syriac Orthodox Patriarch of Antioch and All the East
- Church: Syriac Orthodox Church
- See: Antioch
- Installed: 724
- Term ended: 739/740
- Predecessor: Elias I of Antioch
- Successor: Iwannis I

Athanasius III was the Patriarch of Antioch and head of the Syriac Orthodox Church from 724 until his death in 739/740.

== Biography ==
Athanasius was a monk at the monastery of Gubo Baroyo, and later became its abbot. He succeeded Elias I as patriarch of Antioch in April 724 (AG 1035), and was consecrated at the monastery of Qartmin by Theodosius, bishop of Reshʿayna, according to the Chronicle of Michael the Syrian. Bar Hebraeus in his Ecclesiastical History noted it was alternatively asserted that Athanasius had been a monk at the monastery of Harbaz, and that he was consecrated at Edessa by its bishop Gabriel, but this can be disregarded. The Zuqnin Chronicle erroneously places Athanasius' consecration in 729 (AG 1041).

The History of the Patriarchs of Alexandria records that Athanasius had been a bishop prior to becoming patriarch, and that the Caliph Hisham ibn Abd al-Malik had selected him as Elias' successor. Upon his ascension to the patriarchal office, Athanasius exchanged synodal letters with the Coptic Pope Alexander II of Alexandria to confirm their two churches were in communion. At Damascus, the Caliph Hisham had Athanasius construct his residence next to the caliphal palace's reception hall so that Hisham could hear his prayers and scriptural readings.

In 726, a christological dispute arose with the Armenian Apostolic Church after a Julianist monk had claimed to the Catholicos John of Odzun that the Syriac Orthodox Church taught that the body of Christ was corrupted. The issue stemmed from the split between Severus of Antioch and Julian of Halicarnassus in that the former argued the body of Christ was theoretically corruptible, which was accepted by the Syriac Orthodox Church, whilst the latter advocated the belief that Christ's body was incorruptible, which was supported by the Julianist sect. John wrote to Athanasius to ask him to clarify the Church's position on the corruptibility of the body of Christ, and expressed his desire for their churches to be in communion. After they had exchanged letters, John convened the council of Manzikert to settle the issue and achieve union between the Armenian and Syriac churches, for which Athanasius sent six bishops to represent him.

The council was partially successful in that the two churches agreed on their condemnation of the Council of Chalcedon of 451 and of the Julianist sect, and communion was established, however, the council also rejected Severus of Antioch's assertion of the corruptibility of Christ's body in favour of the formulation of Cyril of Alexandria, and no agreement could be reached on a number of liturgical practices. In Dionysius bar Salibi's Against the Armenians, it is attested that Athanasius transferred a monastery to John on the frontier between Armenia and Syria to act as a residence for three Armenian bishops to provide teaching to those who had migrated to Syria and had begun to adhere to Chalcedonian or Julianist doctrine due to a lack of Armenian clergy there. Adherents of both churches were to reside in this monastery to learn both Armenian and Syriac, and translate Syriac patristic works into Armenian.

Athanasius died in 739/740 (AG 1051), as per the Ecclesiastical History of Bar Hebraeus. Athanasius' death is alternatively placed in 743/744 (AG 1055) by Michael the Syrian, and 745/746 (AG 1057) by the Zuqnin Chronicle.

== Bibliography ==
- Burleson, Samuel; Van Rompay, Lucas (2011). "List of Patriarchs: II. The Syriac Orthodox Church and its Uniate continuations". In Sebastian P. Brock; Aaron M. Butts; George A. Kiraz; Lucas Van Rompay (eds.). Gorgias Encyclopedic Dictionary of the Syriac Heritage: Electronic Edition. Gorgias Press.
- Chabot, Jean-Baptiste, ed. (1905). Chronique de Michel le Syrien (in French). Vol. III. Paris: Ernest Leroux.
- Evetts, Basil Thomas Alfred, ed. (1904). History of the Patriarchs of the Coptic Church of Alexandria. Vol. III. Beth Mardutho.
- Harrak, Amir (1999). The Chronicle of Zuqnin, Parts III and IV A.D. 488–775. Toronto: Pontifical Institute of Mediaeval Studies. ISBN 9780888442864.
- Mathews, Edward G. (1998). The Armenian Commentary on Genesis Attributed to Ephrem the Syrian. Peeters Publishers.
- Mazzola, Marianna, ed. (2018). Bar 'Ebroyo's Ecclesiastical History : writing Church History in the 13th century Middle East. PSL Research University.
- Moosa, Matti, ed. (2014). The Syriac Chronicle of Michael Rabo (the Great): A Universal History from the Creation. Beth Antioch Press.
- Palmer, Andrew (1990). Monk and Mason on the Tigris Frontier: The Early History of Tur Abdin. Cambridge University Press.
- Stopka, Krzysztof (2016). Armenia Christiana: Armenian Religious Identity and the Churches of Constantinople and Rome (4th–15th Century). Jagiellonian University Press.
- Tannous, Jack (2020). The Making of the Medieval Middle East: Religion, Society, and Simple Believers. Princeton University Press.
- Wilmshurst, David (2019). "West Syrian patriarchs and maphrians". In Daniel King (ed.). The Syriac World. Routledge. pp. 806–813.

Preceded by Elias I of Antioch	Syriac Orthodox Patriarch of Antioch; 724–739/740	Succeeded by Iwannis I
