= Chronicle of 819 =

The Chronicle of 819, also called the Chronicle of Qarṭmin, is a chronological table of important events and people from the birth of Jesus down to the year AD 819 written in Syriac by an anonymous Miaphysite monk from the monastery of Qarṭmin. It contains lists of the Abbasid caliphs for 785–813 and the Syriac Orthodox patriarchs for 788–819.

== Authorship and transmission ==
The Chronicle was discovered in a large 9th-century codex unearthed by Aphrem Barsaum in the village of Basabrina in 1911. A search for the codex could not locate it in 1984, and it seems likely that it was destroyed during the Assyrian genocide in 1915. A transcription of the chronicle made by Barsaum may still be kept somewhere in France. According to a marginal notice, the codex was copied by one Severus for his uncle David, bishop of Ḥarrān. This David was a former monk of Qarṭmin who is known to have been consecrated as a bishop by Patriarch John IV of Antioch between 846 and 873. The codex also contains church canons and patriarchal letters. The Chronicle appears as a "self-contained collection of historical notices". A later hand added a historical notice of the drought of 1094–95, which places the manuscript in Basabrina by that date. The Chronicle of 819 was incorporated almost in its entirety into the Chronicle of 846. It is the later chronicle's main source for the Islamic period.

The Chronicle of 819 may be the work of up to three authors, with changes in authorship coinciding with the periods 728–733 and 775–785. The signs of Qarṭminite authorship in the work are extensive and conclusive. Out of 125 entries, 15 mention the monastery. In 1959, the Syriac Orthodox patriarch Philoxenus Dolabani claimed without citing his source that the chronicle was the work of the "renowned scribe" Manṣur, abbot of Qarṭmin and son of Marzuq, a priest of Basabrina. This appears to have been a mere conjecture.

== Sources and content ==
The Chronicle gives roughly even coverage of ecclesiastical and secular events. For the early period, its main source is the Chronicle of Edessa, which ends in 540. It also includes material from Eusebius of Caesarea. Of the 74 entries before this year, the Chronicle of Edessa is the source for 62. Its information is not passed on verbatim, but is often abbreviated and in some cases modified, as when the Chronicle of 819 labels Ibas of Edessa a heretic. For the 7th and 8th centuries, it relies heavily on the archives of the monastery of Qarṭmin. These centuries take up about half the length of the chronicle. The other sources for the later centuries are less clear, but may include the lost chronicle of Jacob of Edessa (died 708), which was known at Qarṭmin. John of Ephesus' biography of Jacob Baradaeus was also used as a source. The Chronicle of 819 shares a lost Miaphysite source with the anti-Miaphysite Chronicle of 641.

The Chronicle's coverage of political affairs, including military encounters between the Abbasids and the Romans (Byzantines), between 762 and 819 is especially valuable. The chronicle is unique among Syriac histories in completely ignoring the reign of the Roman emperor Heraclius. From the 7th century on it does not document the succession of Roman emperors and focuses exclusively on the caliphs. It does not mention the caliphs Yazīd III and Ibrāhīm ibn al-Walīd, who ruled briefly in 744, because they were not recognized in Upper Mesopotamia. The last event recorded is the consecration as patriarch of Dionysius of Tel Maḥre, which is dated to 819 although it actually took place in August 818. The chronicle was probably completed shortly after this at Qarṭmin, as it contains more information about that monastery than any other chronicle.

== Bibliography ==
=== Editions ===
- Edited by Aphrem Barsaum as "Chronicon anonymum ad annum Domini 819 pertinens" in Jean-Baptiste Chabot (ed.), Anonymi auctoris chronicon ad annum Christi 1234 pertinens, CSCO 81 (Paris, 1920), pp. 3–22.
- Translated into Latin by Jean-Baptiste Chabot in Anonymi auctoris chronicon ad annum Christi 1234 pertinens, CSCO 109 (Louvain, 1937), pp. 1–16.
- Extracts translated into English are found in Palmer 1993, pp. 75–80.

=== Secondary literature ===
- Brock, Sebastian (1979–80). "Syriac Historical Writing: A Survey of the Main Sources". Journal of the Iraqi Academy (Syriac Corporation). 5: 296–326 [1–30].
- Ginkel, Jan van (2016). "Melkite Chronicle of 641". In Graeme Dunphy; Cristian Bratu (eds.). Encyclopedia of the Medieval Chronicle. Brill Online. doi:10.1163/2213-2139_emc_SIM_01815.
- Griffith, Sidney H. (1991). "Chronicle of 819". In Kazhdan, Alexander (ed.). The Oxford Dictionary of Byzantium. Oxford and New York: Oxford University Press. ISBN 0-19-504652-8.
- Harrak, Amir (2018). "Chronicles, Syriac". In Oliver Nicholson (ed.). The Oxford Dictionary of Late Antiquity. Vol. 1. Oxford University Press. pp. 338–339.
- Hoyland, Robert G. (1997). Seeing Islam As Others Saw It: A Survey and Evaluation of Christian, Jewish and Zoroastrian Writings on Early Islam. Darwin Press.
- Palmer, Andrew (1990). Monk and Mason on the Tigris Frontier: The Early History of Ṭur ʿAbdin. Cambridge University Press.
- Palmer, Andrew (1993). The Seventh Century in the West-Syrian Chronicles. Liverpool University Press.
- Witakowski, Witold (1999–2000). "The Chronicle of Eusebius: Its Type and Continuation in Syriac Historiography". ARAM Periodical. 11–12: 419–437.
