= Chronicle of 846 =

The Chronicle of 846 is a fragmentary universal chronicle written in Syriac by an anonymous author sometime between 846 and 873. Its focus for the later centuries, where it is most valuable, is ecclesiastical history. It is written from a Syriac Orthodox perspective.

== Date, authorship and transmission ==
The Chronicle is found on folios 1–36, 40 and 41 of a single manuscript, Brit. Mus. Add. MS 14642, which was copied in the early 10th century in Esṭrangela script. The copy is a palimpsest: the folios were taken from five different Greek manuscripts, erased and written over. A "perfectly distinct work", the Chronicle of 813, is bound immediately after it in the codex but was originally a separate manuscript. The original text of the Chronicle of 846 began with Creation, but this part has been lost. The text as it stands begins with the birth of Levi to the Hebrew patriarch Jacob. Owing to damage and loss, there are lacunae in the preserved text for the periods 30 BC–AD 37, 230–275, 431–449, 540–574, 582–601 and 610–679.

The end of the text is not defective. The last event recorded being the ordination of John IV of Antioch in 846, it was probably put in its final form shortly after this date and before John's death in 873. The original chronicle may have ended in 784, before a second compiler extended it with a list of names and dates down to 846. The text's first editor, E. W. Brooks, suggested that, to judge from the number of references to the bishops of Ḥarrān, it may have been composed in that location. He later suggested that it may have been written at the monastery of Qarṭmin, but Ephrem Barsaum points out that the connection to Qarṭmin derives from the chronicle's reliance on the Chronicle of 819, which probably was composed there.

The only surviving copy of the Chronicle of 819 was made by a certain Severus for his uncle David, a monk of Qarṭmin consecrated bishop of Ḥarrān by John IV. Andrew Palmer therefore suggests that the Chronicle of 846 is the work of David, who commissioned his nephew to make a copy of an earlier chronicle for this purpose. Even he is not the main author of the Chronicle of 846, he may be the compiler who extended it from 784 to 846 and interpolated information from the Chronicle of 819. Elsewhere, Palmer suggests that Nonnus of Ḥarrān, a monk of Qarṭmin who became bishop of Ṭur ʿAbdin shortly before 845, may have been the final redactor of the Chronicle of 846.

== Sources, content and structure ==
The Chronicle is a series of chronologically ordered short notices, typically preceded by the year given in the Seleucid era. The early, universal part relies on the Chronicle of Eusebius of Caesarea. The later sections are local in character and rely on non-universal chronicles, as well as lists of bishops and the canons of church councils. For the 5th and 6th centuries its focus is ecclesiastical history. Among its sources are the Ecclesiastical History of John of Ephesus, the Ecclesiastical History of Pseudo-Zacharias Rhetor, the lost chronicle of Jacob of Edessa and the Teaching of Addai. It also shares sources with the Melkite Chronicle of 641 and the Chronicle of Edessa. For the 7th and 8th centuries, after the rise of Islam, it depends upon the Chronicle of 819.

For the period 679–784, the Chronicle of 846 is uncharacteristically political in describing events in the Byzantine Empire and the Islamic Caliphate. Its account of this period is generally independent of any other surviving source. Down to 728 it is primarily a political history, but from 734 it reverts to ecclesiastical history with caliphal notices. The final section contains a list of caliphs from 784 until the reign of al-Maʾmūn (813–833), but does not mention his death, and a list of Syriac Orthodox patriarchs of Antioch from 784 until 846.

The Chronicle of 846 overlaps with certain works that depend on the same sources, such as the Chronicle of Zuqnin (775) and the works of Theophanes the Confessor (9th century), Michael the Syrian (12th century) and Bar Hebraeus (13th century). It does contain unique material not found elsewhere, almost entirely for the periods 574–582, 601–610 and 679–846. These include the exactions of the Arab governors of Iraq and an otherwise unknown bishop of Edessa, Athanasius, around 750. As befits its Syriac Orthodox point of view, the Chronicle is hostile to the Byzantine emperor Leo III the Isaurian and favourable to the Caliph ʿUmar. Its account of the campaign of Sharāḥīl ibn ʿUbayda against the Bulgars during the siege of Constantinople (717–718) may be derived from an Arabic source.

== Bibliography ==
- Brock, Sebastian (1979–80). "Syriac Historical Writing: A Survey of the Main Sources". Journal of the Iraqi Academy (Syriac Corporation). 5: 296–326 [1–30].
- Brooks, E. W. (1897). "A Syriac Chronicle of the Year 846". Zeitschrift der Deutschen Morgenländischen Gesellschaft. 51 (4): 569–588. JSTOR 43362641.
- Brooks, E. W. (1906). "The Sources of Theophanes and the Syriac Chroniclers". Byzantinische Zeitschrift. 15 (2): 578–587. doi:10.1515/byzs.1906.15.2.578. S2CID 192524195.
- Harrak, Amir (2018). "Chronicles, Syriac". In Oliver Nicholson (ed.). The Oxford Dictionary of Late Antiquity. Vol. 1. Oxford University Press. pp. 338–339.
- Hoyland, Robert G. (1997). Seeing Islam as Others Saw It: A Survey and Evaluation of Christian, Jewish and Zoroastrian Writings on Early Islam. Darwin Press.
- Palmer, Andrew (1990). Monk and Mason on the Tigris Frontier: The Early History of Ṭur ʿAbdin. Cambridge University Press.
- Palmer, Andrew (1993). The Seventh Century in the West-Syrian Chronicles. Liverpool University Press.
- Witakowski, Witold (2011). "Historiography, Syriac". In Sebastian P. Brock; Aaron M. Butts; George A. Kiraz; Lucas Van Rompay (eds.). Gorgias Encyclopedic Dictionary of the Syriac Heritage. Gorgias Press.
