= Dionysius II of Antioch =

58th Patriarch of Syriac Orthodox Church of Antioch (896 - 908)

Dionysius II
- Syriac Orthodox Patriarch of Antioch and All the East
- Church: Syriac Orthodox Church
- See: Antioch
- Installed: 896/897
- Term ended: 908/909
- Predecessor: Theodosius Romanus
- Successor: John V

Personal details
- Died: 18 April 908/909

Dionysius II (Syriac: ܕܝܘܢܢܘܣܝܘܣ ܬܪܝܢܐ, Arabic: ديونيسيوس الثاني) was the Patriarch of Antioch and head of the Syriac Orthodox Church from 896/897 until his death in 908/909.

== Biography ==
Dionysius studied and became a monk at the monastery of Beth Batin, near Harran in Upper Mesopotamia. He was chosen to succeed Theodosius Romanus as patriarch of Antioch in an election by lot, and was consecrated on 23 April 896/897 (AG 1208) (Note: Dionysius' ascension is placed either in 896, or 897.) by archbishop Jacob of Emesa at the village of Ashit, near Sarug, according to the histories of Michael the Syrian and Bar Hebraeus.

Soon after his ascension to the patriarchal office, Dionysius convened a synod at the monastery of Saint Shila, at which he issued twenty-five canons and was attended by thirty-five bishops. He served as patriarch of Antioch until his death on 18 April 908/909 (AG 1220) at the monastery of Beth Batin, where he was buried. As patriarch, Dionysius ordained fifty bishops, as per Michael the Syrian's Chronicle, whereas Bar Hebraeus in his Ecclesiastical History credits Dionysius with the ordination of fifty-one bishops.

== Episcopal succession ==
As patriarch, Dionysius ordained the following bishops:

- Theodosius, archbishop of Edessa
- Iwannis, archbishop of Samosata
- Timothy, archbishop of Damascus
- John, bishop of Tribus
- Jacob, bishop of Irenopolis
- Ignatius, bishop of Qinnasrin
- John, bishop of Zuptara
- John, bishop of Harran
- Daniel, archbishop of Samosata
- Cyriacus, bishop of Baalbek
- Gabriel, archbishop of Cyrrhus
- Isaac, archbishop of Herat
- Philoxenus, archbishop
- Dioscorus, archbishop of Edessa
- Habib, bishop of Irenopolis
- Samuel, archbishop of Maipherqat
- Abraham, archbishop of Aphrah
- Isaac, bishop of Nisibis
- John, bishop of Tur Abdin
- Job, bishop of Callisura
- Theodosius, bishop of Reshʿayna
- Cyril, archbishop of Tarsus
- Theophilus, bishop of Zuptara
- Daniel, bishop of Armenia
- Gregory, archbishop of Raqqa
- Jacob, bishop of Abadqawau
- Abraham, bishop of Doula
- Cosmas, bishop of Hadath
- Peter, archbishop of Resafa
- Jacob, bishop of Tiberias
- Moses, bishop of Amid
- George, bishop of Hadath
- John, bishop of Marde
- Timothy, bishop of Circesium
- Anastasius, bishop of Abadqawan
- Athanasius, archbishop of Damascus
- Athanasius, archbishop of Tarsus
- Theodoretus, archbishop of Maipherqat
- Gabriel, archbishop of Apamea
- Isaac, bishop of Armenia
- Jacob, bishop of Doliche
- Elias, bishop of Melitene
- Ignatius, bishop of Irenopolis
- Iwannis, archbishop of Dara
- Ignatius, archbishop of Amid
- Isaac, bishop of Zeugma
- Timothy, bishop of Samosata
- Basil, bishop of Bithynia
- Timothy, archbishop of Edessa
- Joseph, bishop of Sarug

== Bibliography ==
- Barsoum, Ephrem (2003). The Scattered Pearls: A History of Syriac Literature and Sciences. Translated by Matti Moosa (2nd ed.). Gorgias Press.
- Burleson, Samuel; Van Rompay, Lucas (2011). "List of Patriarchs: II. The Syriac Orthodox Church and its Uniate continuations". In Sebastian P. Brock; Aaron M. Butts; George A. Kiraz; Lucas Van Rompay (eds.). Gorgias Encyclopedic Dictionary of the Syriac Heritage: Electronic Edition. Gorgias Press.
- Chabot, Jean-Baptiste, ed. (1905). Chronique de Michel le Syrien (in French). Vol. III. Paris: Ernest Leroux.
- Mazzola, Marianna, ed. (2018). Bar 'Ebroyo's Ecclesiastical History : writing Church History in the 13th century Middle East. PSL Research University.
- Palmer, Andrew (1990). Monk and Mason on the Tigris Frontier: The Early History of Tur Abdin. Cambridge University Press.
- Wilmshurst, David (2019). "West Syrian patriarchs and maphrians". In Daniel King (ed.). The Syriac World. Routledge. pp. 806–813.

| Preceded by Theodosius Romanus | Syriac Orthodox Patriarch of Antioch; 896/897–908/909 | Succeeded by John V |
