= Theodosius Romanus =

57th Patriarch of Syriac Orthodox Church of Antioch

- Syriac Orthodox Patriarch of Antioch and All the East
- Church: Syriac Orthodox Church
- See: Antioch
- Installed: 887
- Term ended: 896
- Predecessor: Ignatius II
- Successor: Dionysius II

Personal details
- Born: Tikrit, Abbasid Caliphate
- Died: 1 June 896

Theodosius Romanus (Syriac: ܦܛܪܝܪܟܐ ܬܐܘܕܘܣܝܘܣ, Arabic: البطريرك ثاودوسيوس) was the Patriarch of Antioch and head of the Syriac Orthodox Church from 887 until his death in 896.

== Biography ==
Romanus was born at Tikrit in the 9th century and became a monk at the monastery of Qartmin in Tur Abdin. He was educated in medicine and became known as a skilful physician. His nickname, "the Roman" (Romanus), was derived from his knowledge of Greek. At this time, the patriarchal office had lain vacant for four years after the death of Ignatius II in 883 due to disagreement amongst the church's bishops. In response to the demands of their congregants, the bishops assembled at Amida to deliberate and hold an election by lot in which twelve names were put forward.

Romanus was thus chosen to succeed Ignatius II as patriarch of Antioch, and was consecrated at Amida on 5 February 887 (AG 1198) by Timothy, archbishop of Samosata, upon which he assumed the name Theodosius. No details of Theodosius' tenure as patriarch are known, except that he had some buildings constructed at the monastery of Qartmin with Ezekiel, bishop of Tur Abdin. He served as patriarch of Antioch until his death on 1 June 896 (AG 1207) at the monastery of Qartmin, where he was buried. As patriarch, Theodosius ordained thirty-two bishops, as per Michael the Syrian's Chronicle, whereas Bar Hebraeus in his Ecclesiastical History credits Theodosius with the ordination of thirty-three bishops.

== Works ==
Theodosius translated and commented on the Book of Hierotheos at the request of Lazarus, bishop of Cyrrhus. His commentary consisted of five books in three treatises, of which the first two treatises were completed at Amida, whilst the third was finished at Samosata. Although the book had been deemed heretical and repudiated by the Patriarch Quriaqos of Tagrit as the work of Stephen Bar Sudhaile in a canonical statement at a synod, Theodosius seems to have accepted its authenticity and makes no mention of Stephen. Theodosius' positive opinion of the book has been noted to reflect the tradition of mysticism prevalent at the monastery of Qartmin. Theodosius' commentary was later used by Bar Hebraeus in his own commentary on the book, and was also recopied by Abu Nasr of Bartella in 1290 in a manuscript entitled On The Hidden Mysteries of the House of God, but only contained half of the commentary (Za'faran MS. 213).

Other surviving works include a medical syntagma (Syriac: Kunnash, "compendium") attributed to Theodosius, as noted by Bar Hebraeus, of which only a fragment survives (Vatican MS. 192). In addition, a synodical epistle to Pope Michael III of Alexandria and a homily for Lent, both of which are in Arabic, is preserved (Brit. Mus. MS. 7206). He also wrote a treatise for the deacon George in which he compiled and explained one hundred and twelve maxims (Syriac: melle remzonoyoto d-ḥakime, "symbolic sayings of wise men"), most of which were of Pythagorean origin that he had translated from Greek into Syriac; a copy of this treatise in Syriac and Arabic still survives (Paris MS. 157). A few canons were later also attributed to Theodosius.

== Episcopal succession ==
As patriarch, Theodosius ordained the following bishops:

1. Athanasius, archbishop of Tikrit
2. Job, archbishop of Herat
3. Dionysius, archbishop of Apamea
4. Cyril, archbishop of Anazarbus
5. Dionysius, bishop of Tella
6. Ezekiel, bishop of Melitene
7. Daniel, archbishop of Damascus
8. Denha, bishop of Callisura
9. George, bishop of Circesium
10. Gabriel, archbishop of Tiberias
11. Michael, archbishop of Mabbogh
12. Jacob, archbishop of Samosata
13. Ignatius, archbishop of Aphrah
14. Ezekiel, bishop of Tur Abdin
15. Silvanus, bishop of Arzen
16. Basil, bishop of Armenia
17. John, bishop of Irenopolis
18. Habib, archbishop of Anazarbus
19. Simeon, bishop of Tell Besme
20. Habib, archbishop of Resafa
21. John, bishop of Sarug
22. Lazarus, archbishop of Tarsus
23. Elias, bishop of Gisra
24. Habib, bishop of Kaishum
25. Basil, bishop of Zeugma
26. Matthew, bishop of Tella
27. Thomas, bishop of Circesium
28. Thomas, bishop of Irenopolis
29. Severus, bishop of Dara
30. Jacob, bishop of the Najranites
31. Habib, bishop of Irenopolis
32. Sergius, bishop of Reshʿayna

== Bibliography ==
- Barsoum, Ephrem (2003). The Scattered Pearls: A History of Syriac Literature and Sciences. Translated by Matti Moosa (2nd ed.). Gorgias Press.
- Chabot, Jean-Baptiste, ed. (1905). Chronique de Michel le Syrien (in French). Vol. III. Paris: Ernest Leroux.
- Mazzola, Marianna, ed. (2018). Bar 'Ebroyo's Ecclesiastical History : writing Church History in the 13th century Middle East. PSL Research University.
- Palmer, Andrew (1990). Monk and Mason on the Tigris Frontier: The Early History of Tur Abdin. Cambridge University Press.
- Van Rompay, Lucas (2011). "Theodosios Romanos the physician". In Sebastian P. Brock; Aaron M. Butts; George A. Kiraz; Lucas Van Rompay (eds.). Gorgias Encyclopedic Dictionary of the Syriac Heritage: Electronic Edition. Gorgias Press.

Preceded by Ignatius II	Syriac Orthodox Patriarch of Antioch; 887–896	Succeeded by Dionysius II
