= Ignatius II =

56th Patriarch of Syriac Orthodox Church of Antioch (878-883)

- Syriac Orthodox Patriarch of Antioch and All the East
- Church: Syriac Orthodox Church
- See: Antioch
- Installed: 878
- Term ended: 883
- Predecessor: John IV
- Successor: Theodosius Romanus

Personal details
- Died: 883

Ignatius II (Note: He is counted as either Ignatius I, as the first Syriac Orthodox patriarch of Antioch by that name, or Ignatius II, after Ignatius (r. c. 70–c. 107).) (Syriac: ܐܝܓܢܐܛܝܘܣ ܬܪܝܢܐ, Arabic: اغناطيوس الثاني) was the Patriarch of Antioch and head of the Syriac Orthodox Church from 878 until his death in 883.

== Biography ==
Ignatius was born in the 9th century and became a monk at the monastery of Harbaz. He was chosen to succeed John IV as patriarch of Antioch and was consecrated on 5 June 878 (AG 1189) by Timothy of Samosata at a synod at the monastery of Saint Zacchaeus at Raqqa, which was attended by four bishops. Upon his consecration, Ignatius issued twelve canons.

He soon came into conflict with Sergius, archbishop of Tikrit and ex officio Grand Metropolitan of the East, the highest-ranking prelate amongst the eastern bishops (bishops of the former Sasanian Empire). Sergius had lost the recognition of the eastern bishops after he had allocated dioceses to Elisha' and Bar Hadh Bshabba, who had been excommunicated by both Patriarch John IV and Basil II Lazarus, Sergius' predecessor as archbishop of Tikrit and Grand Metropolitan of the East. He was thus not invited to attend Ignatius' consecration, to which he responded by withholding his recognition of Ignatius and refused to have his name proclaimed in the east.

The dispute between Ignatius and Sergius was eventually resolved after they were imprisoned and fined 2000 dinars. He served as patriarch of Antioch until his death on 26 March 883 (AG 1194) at Meriba, where he was buried.

== Episcopal succession ==
As patriarch, Ignatius ordained the following bishops:

1. Severus, bishop of Res-Kepha
2. Abraham, archbishop of Anazarbus
3. Sergius, archbishop of Cyrrhus
4. Cyriacus, archbishop of Edessa
5. Abraham, bishop of Aleppo
6. John, bishop of Germanicia
7. Michael, bishop of Samosata
8. John, archbishop of Amida
9. Abraham, bishop of Circesium
10. Elias, bishop of Hadath
11. Simeon, bishop of Zuptara
12. Cyril, bishop of Maipherqat
13. Gabriel, bishop of Sarug
14. Jacob, bishop of Baalbek
15. Cyriacus, archbishop of Anazarbus
16. Constantine, bishop of Harran
17. Aaron, archbishop of Maipherqat
18. Gabriel, bishop of Arabia
19. Matthew, archbishop of Dara
20. Iwannis, bishop of Abadqawan
21. Severus, archbishop of Segestan
22. Severus, archbishop of Raqqa
23. Theodosius, bishop of Doula
24. John, archbishop of Mabbogh
25. John, bishop of Doliche
26. Severus, archbishop of Jerusalem

== Bibliography ==
- Barsoum, Ephrem (2003). The Scattered Pearls: A History of Syriac Literature and Sciences. Translated by Matti Moosa (2nd ed.). Gorgias Press.
- Burleson, Samuel; Van Rompay, Lucas (2011). "List of Patriarchs: II. The Syriac Orthodox Church and its Uniate continuations". In Sebastian P. Brock; Aaron M. Butts; George A. Kiraz; Lucas Van Rompay (eds.). Gorgias Encyclopedic Dictionary of the Syriac Heritage: Electronic Edition. Gorgias Press.
- Chabot, Jean-Baptiste, ed. (1905). Chronique de Michel le Syrien (in French). Vol. III. Paris: Ernest Leroux.
- Ignatius Jacob III (2008). History of the Monastery of Saint Matthew in Mosul. Translated by Matti Moosa. Gorgias Press.
- Mazzola, Marianna, ed. (2018). Bar 'Ebroyo's Ecclesiastical History : writing Church History in the 13th century Middle East. PSL Research University.
- Wilmshurst, David (2019). "West Syrian patriarchs and maphrians". In Daniel King (ed.). The Syriac World. Routledge. pp. 806–813.

| Preceded by John IV | Syriac Orthodox Patriarch of Antioch; 878–883 | Succeeded by Theodosius Romanus |
