= Euphemia and the Goth =

First century Syriac romance text

Euphemia and the Goth is a romance text of Syriac literature. It is set at Edessa in Mesopotamia in 396 AD but the story appears to have been written in the fifth century AD. The text is known to have survived in two Syriac manuscripts (the earlier of the 9th century) and in a Greek translation.

== Narrative overview ==
The narrative pertains to a Gothic soldier in the Roman army stationed at Edessa to help repel the Huns. He is billeted with a widow named Sophia, and wishes to marry her only daughter Euphemia. Sophia takes him to the tombs of the Confessors Shmona, Gurya, and Habib, where she makes him promise to protect Euphemia.

The Goth takes Euphemia to his home only to have her enslaved to his Gothic wife. Euphemia's infant is then poisoned by the wife, but Euphemia revenges when she kills the wife by using the same poison. Euphemia is then shut in the tomb of the wife, but after praying to the Confessors, she is instantly transferred back to tombs of the Confessors and returns to her mother Sophia in Edessa.

The Goth sometime later returns to Edessa and is confronted by Euphemia and Sophia. Both make an affidavit against him concerning Euphemia's affliction, and though the bishop of Edessa Eulogius intervened, the Stratelates of Edessa has the Goth beheaded.

== Genre ==
The story is seen as a Hagiographical tale, written to celebrate the miraculous works of the martyrs Shmona, Gurya and Habbib. Although the story may have been based on historical events, the actual bishop of Edessa in 396 was Cyrus; Eulogius died in 387. Many sources state that Habib died in the early fourth century.

== See also ==
- Acts of Shmona and of Gurya
- Acts of Sharbel

== Editions ==
- F. C. Burkitt, ed. Euphemia and the Goth, with the Acts of Martyrdom of the Confessors of Edessa. Williams and Norgate, 1913. Reprinted by Gorgias Press, 2007.
- Symeon Metaphrastes. "Miracle Concerning Euphemia the Young Maiden [Θαῦμα εἰς Εὐφημίαν τὴν κόρην]". In Stratis Papaioannou (trans. and eds.). Christian Novels from the Menologion of Symeon Metaphrastes. Dumbarton Oaks. 2017. pp. 117–151. ISBN 9780674975064.

== Bibliography ==
- Brock, Sebastian P. (2018) [2011]. "Euphemia and the Goth". In Sebastian P. Brock; Aaron M. Butts; George A. Kiraz; Lucas Van Rompay (eds.). Gorgias Encyclopedic Dictionary of the Syriac Heritage: Electronic Edition. Gorgias Press; online Beth Mardutho.
- Aasgaard, Reidar; Horn, Cornelia (2017). Childhood in History: Perceptions of Children in the Ancient and Medieval Worlds. Routledge. ISBN 9781317168935.
- Saint-Laurent, Jeanne-Nicole Mellon; Nicholson, Oliver (2018). "Euphemia and the Goth". In Oliver Nicholson (ed.). The Oxford Dictionary of Late Antiquity. Vol. 1. Oxford University Press. pp. 563–564. ISBN 9780192562463.
