= Reliquary with the Tooth of Saint John the Baptist =

The Reliquary with the Tooth of Saint John the Baptist is a piece from the Guelph Treasure that is owned and displayed by the Art Institute of Chicago.

== Reliquaries ==
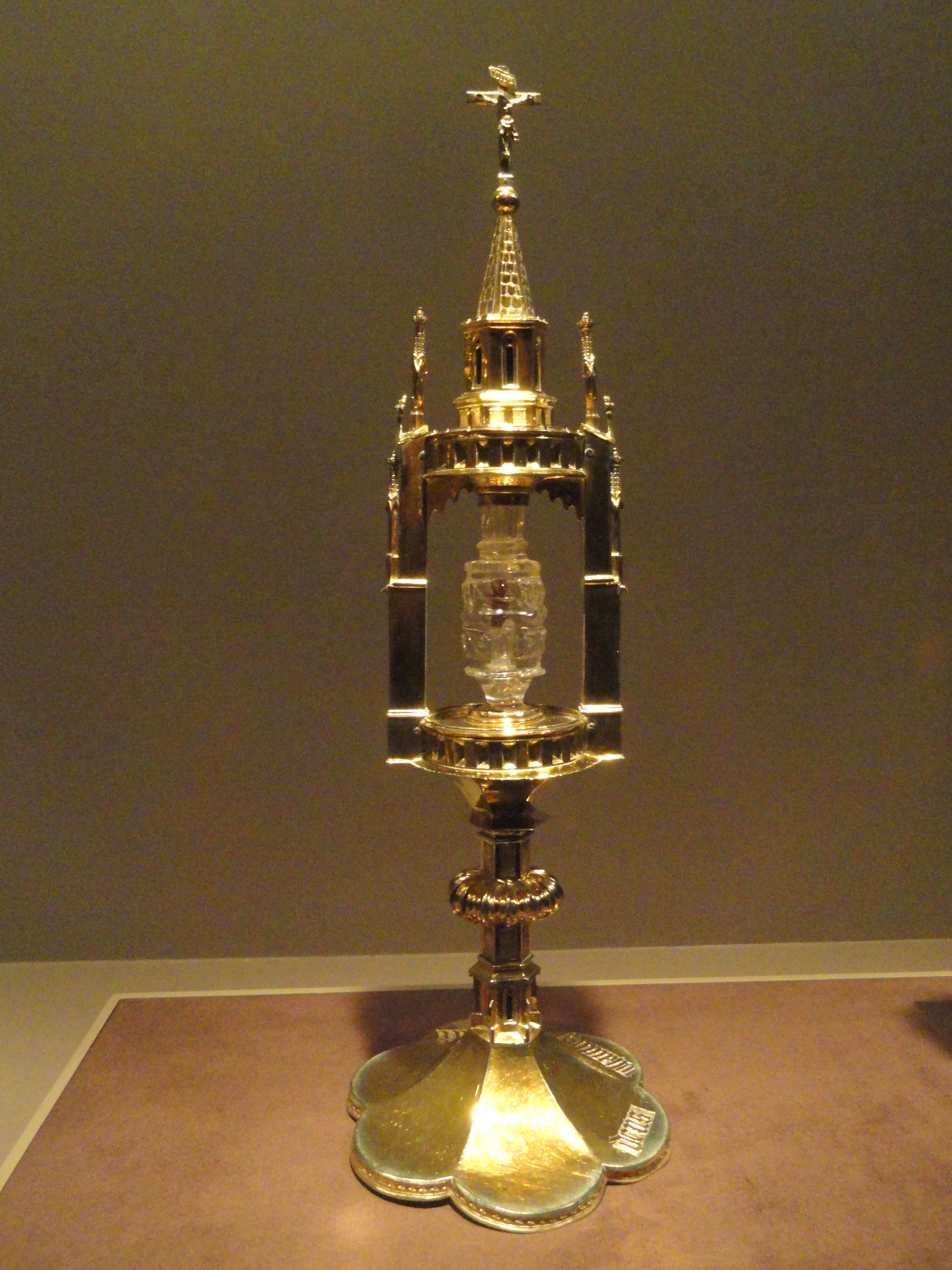
Reliquary with Tooth of Saint John the Baptist (Art Institute of Chicago)

A reliquary is a container that holds a relic. A relic is a part of a person, object, or natural material that is considered sacred or religiously significant. Relics may be things such as the bones of saints or holy soil. A reliquary's content is thought to give it sacred power. In Medieval Europe, reliquary objects were believed to have various powers of blessing and protection, depending on their contents. Multiple religions have been known to utilize reliquaries.
The contents of a variety of reliquaries have been attributed to John the Baptist, including arm bones, finger bones, and skull fragments. The authenticity of these reliquaries is questioned as there are some duplicates. For example, two right arms have been attributed to John the Baptist.
The Art Institute of Chicago owns a collection of reliquary objects that are displayed alongside the Tooth Reliquary, including reliquary caskets from Spain and France, along with three other objects from the Guelph Treasure.

== Origins ==
=== Creation ===
The object is composed of three parts: the metalwork structure (called a monstrance), the rock crystal vessel holding the tooth, and the tooth itself (attributed to Saint John the Baptist). The Reliquary's three parts - metal, crystal, and tooth - were assembled at some point before 1482, as this is the year the complete Reliquary was first documented.

The monstrance is attributed to around 1375-1400 due to its Gothic architectural style. The rock crystal vessel may be a reused oil vial from the medieval Islamic world, about the 1st century CE, as it resembles vials from that period and location. The material was considered precious in the medieval Islamic world.

The tooth itself cannot be authenticated as that of John the Baptist, who was purportedly beheaded in the 1st century CE. Since then, people have claimed to own his various body parts, including his entire head. Many of these body parts are on display in various parts of the world. The identification of these body parts is further complicated by the uncertainty surrounding whether his head was initially buried with the rest of his body. Possible grave sites have been identified, but the head may have been buried elsewhere.

=== House of Guelph ===
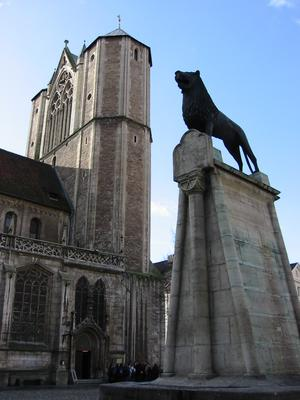
Brunswick Cathedral (Braunschweig, Germany)

The Reliquary was included in the written inventory of the new Cathedral of Saint Blasius, as one piece of the Guelph Treasure, a collection held by the House of Guelph. The House of Guelph was a dynasty of German and British monarchs who ruled from the 11th to 20th century.

In the 11th century, a collection of objects were given to the Cathedral of St. Blasius by Gertrude I Brunon, the cathedral's founder. The documentation of this transfer is the earliest evidence available of the Guelph Treasure as a collection. The Brunon family were counts of Brunswick who later joined the House of Guelph in marriage. The first child of the Guelph/Brunon union was Henry the Lion, who added a number of pieces to the Guelph Treasure. The intermarried families founded the House of Brunswick and Henry the Lion also founded the Brunswick Cathedral, meant to house the collection, but it was not completed until after his death.

== Ownership History ==
=== Europe ===
Documentation showing the year in which the Tooth Reliquary was added to the Guelph Treasure is not available. It is claimed that the tooth was given to Gilduin of Le Puiset by Hugh, the Archbishop of Edessa, in 1120 for transfer to the Cluny abbey. The Reliquary is first mentioned in documentation from 1482, in the inventory of the Church of Saint Blasius. It did not change hands until 1670, when it was gifted by Duke Rudolph August of Brunswick-Luneberg to John Frederick of Hanover, his cousin, as thanks for helping August stifle a rebellion in Brunswick. The Reliquary was kept in the Court Chapel at Hanover from that point until 1803, when it was moved to an unspecified location in England - also then owned by the House of Hanover - to keep it hidden from the anticipated destruction of the impending Napoleonic invasion.
The Reliquary was moved again in 1861 when King George V of Hanover founded the Guelph Museum. All of the remaining objects from the Guelph Treasure were displayed there until 1867, when Prussia annexed Hanover. However, the Guelph Treasure was authorized to be moved to the castle of Cumberland in Gmunden, Austria for protection. At some point before 1869, the objects were moved again to Penzing Castle, near Venice. In 1869, they were entrusted by King George V - by this time no longer King, but the Duke of Cumberland - to the Osterreichisches Museum fur Kunst in Vienna. Almost 50 years later, in 1911, they were again moved to the ducal castle in Gmunden in Austria.The Treasure remained at Gmunden until 1918, when Duke Ernst August II, moved it to an unspecified location in Switzerland, again for protection.

=== Purchase, Traveling Exhibit and Donation in the United States ===
In 1929, the Guelph Treasure collection was put up for sale by Ernest Augustus, then the Duke of Brunswick. Objects in the collection were individually purchased by a handful of dealers, including Julius Falk Goldschmidt, Zacharias Max Hackenbroch, Isaak Rosenbaum, and Saemy Rosenbaum. The Reliquary with the Tooth of Saint John the Baptist was purchased by Julius Falk Goldschmidt. Duke August and these dealers loaned the objects to a series of museums around the United States for a traveling exhibition of the Guelph Treasure. The objects that had not yet been purchased were purchased as they traveled throughout the country.

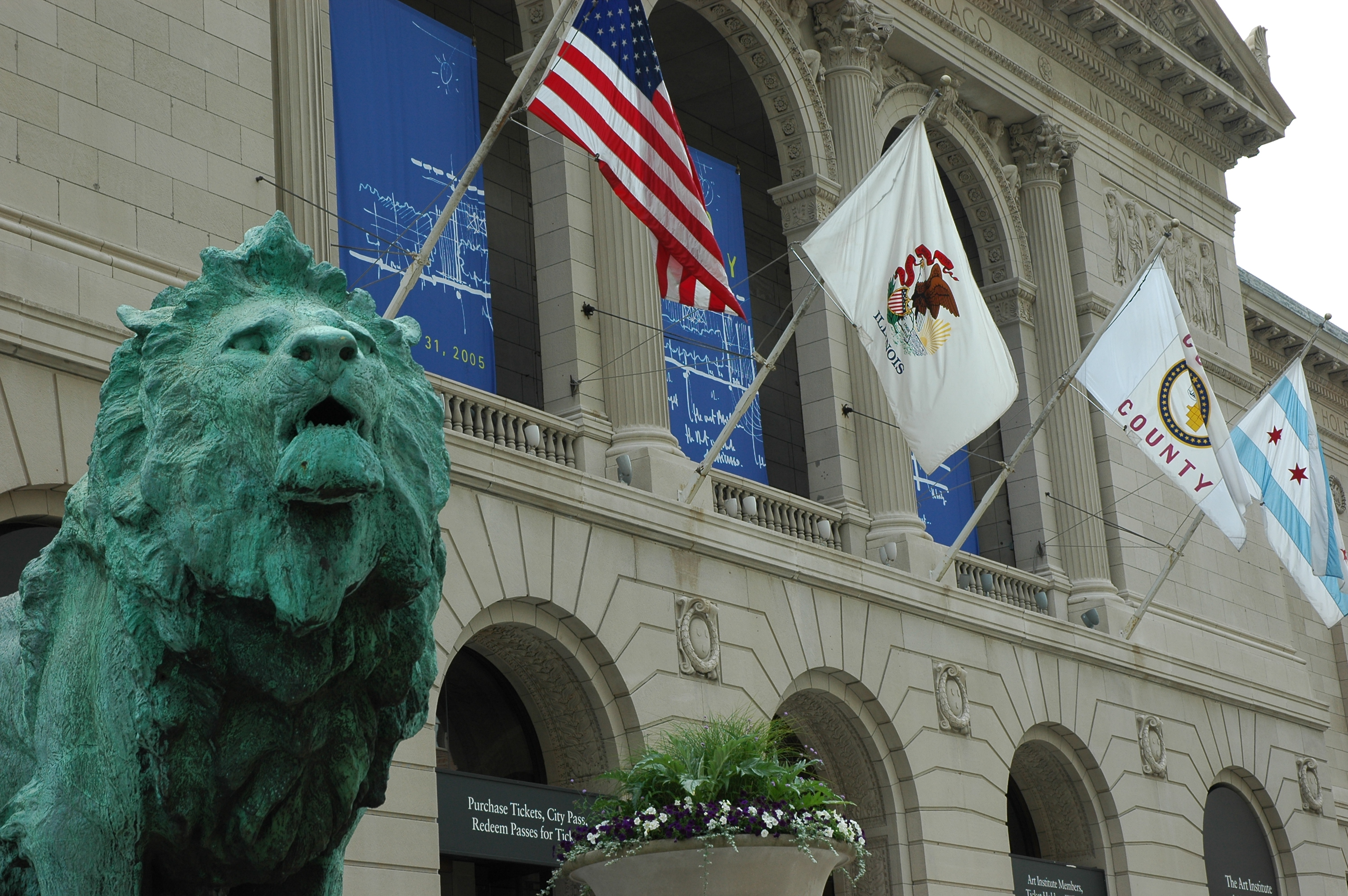
Art Institute of Chicago

Mrs. Marion Chauncey McCormick - late widow of Chauncey McCormick (a trustee at the Art Institute of Chicago) and daughter of Charles Deerling (a benefactor of the Art Institute of Chicago) - purchased the Reliquary from Falk Goldschmidt in 1931 for $10,000. Marion Chauncey McCormick also donated a number of her father's holdings to the Art Institute of Chicago. By April 1931, the Reliquary was on loan at the Art Institute of Chicago. It was accessioned to the museum in 1962 and became part of their permanent collection.

== Carbon-14 Dating ==
=== Results ===
A research team from Oxford University took samples from the tooth in 2016. The results, not widely disseminated, showed the tooth could not have come from John the Baptist but from someone in the 5th century. Experts say the relic still carries value — artistically, historically, perhaps spiritually.
