= Patriarch George I =

Patriarch George I or Giwargis I may refer to:

- Patriarch George I of Alexandria, ruled in 621–631
- Giwargis I (Church of the East), ruled in 661–680
- Patriarch George I of Constantinople, ruled in 679–686
- Patriarch George I of Antioch, head of the Syriac Orthodox Church in 758–790
