= Dionysius II =

Dionysius II may refer to:

- Dionysius II of Syracuse (c. 397 BC – 343 BC), tyrant of Syracuse
- Patriarch Dionysius II of Antioch, Syrian Orthodox Patriarch of Antioch in 896–909
- Patriarch Dionysius II of Constantinople, Ecumenical Patriarch in 1546–1556
- Mar Dionysius II (1742–1816), Malankara Metropolitan 1815–1816
