= Al-Basri =

In Arabic onomastics ("nisbah"), Al-Basri denotes a relationship to or from Basra and may refer to:

- Ibn Hisham (died 833), Abu Muhammad 'Abd al-Malik bin Hisham ibn Ayyub al-Himyari al-Mu'afiri al-Baṣri, biographer of Muhammad
- Ibn al-Haytham (c. 965–c. 1040), Arab mathematician, astronomer, and physicist
- Hasan al-Basri (642–728), Muslim preacher, ascetic, theologian, exegete, scholar, judge, and mystic
- Rabiah al-Basri (c. 714–801), Muslim saint and Sufi mystic
- Saleem Al-Basri (1926–1997), Iraqi actor and comedian actress
- Abu al-Husayn al-Basri (died 1044), Mu'tazilite theologian and expert in Islamic jurisprudence
- Ammar al-Basri (died 845), East Syriac theologian and apologist.
- Al-Jahiz (776–c. 868), Abū ʿUthman ʿAmr ibn Baḥr al-Kinānī al-Baṣrī
