= John IV of Antioch =

55th Patriarch of Syriac Orthodox Church of Antioch (846-873)

John IV
- Syriac Orthodox Patriarch of Antioch and All the East
- Church: Syriac Orthodox Church
- See: Antioch
- Installed: 846
- Term ended: 873
- Predecessor: Dionysius I Telmaharoyo
- Successor: Ignatius II

Personal details
- Died: 3 January 873

John IV (Syriac: Mor Yuhanon) was the Patriarch of Antioch, and head of the Syriac Orthodox Church from 846 until his death in 873.

== Biography ==
John became a monk, and later priest, at the Monastery of St Zacchaeus, near the city of Raqqa in Syria. During this time, he also studied at the monastery. In February 846, following the death of Dionysius I Telmaharoyo, Patriarch of Antioch, John was elected and consecrated Patriarch of Antioch at the Monastery of Shila near Serugh. After his consecration, John issued twenty-five canons. John's twenty-second canon forbade the adoption of pagan funeral customs and his twenty-third canon forbade adherents who had married their daughters to pagans, Jews, and Zoroastrians from entering the church. He corresponded with Pope Joseph I of Alexandria, head of the Coptic Orthodox Church, a fellow miaphysite church, early in his reign.

He later consecrated a certain David, a monk of the Monastery of Qartmin, as Bishop of Harran. In 869, John held the Council of Capharthutha and issued eight canons on the offices of patriarch and maphrian. A total of eighty-six bishops were ordained by John during his tenure and he served in the office of patriarch until his death on 3 January 873.

== Notes ==
- John IV is also counted as John III as the third patriarch of the Syriac Orthodox Church by that name, however, the Syriac Orthodox Church, which claims descent from the Church of Antioch, considers John of the Sedre (r. 631–648) to be the third by that name.

== Bibliography ==
- Barsoum, Ignatius Aphrem (2003). The Scattered Pearls: A History of Syriac Literature and Sciences, trans. Matti Moosa, 2nd rev. ed. Gorgias Press. Archived from the original on 2016-03-16.
- Palmer, Andrew (1990). Monk and Mason on the Tigris Frontier: The Early History of Tur 'Abdin. Cambridge University Press. ISBN 9780521360265.
- Thomas, David Richard; Roggema, Barbara; Sala, Juan Pedro Monferrer (2009). Christian-Muslim Relations: A Bibliographical History (600-900). Brill Publishers. ISBN 9789004169753.

Preceded by Dionysius I Telmaharoyo	Syrian Orthodox Patriarch of Antioch; 846–873	Succeeded by Ignatius II
