= Cyrus II of Edessa =

Christian bishop in the Byzantine Empire (died 498)

Cyrus II (Syriac: Qiyore or Qūrā; died 498) was the archbishop of Edessa and metropolitan of Osrhoene from 471 until his death.

Cyrus succeeded Nonnus as bishop in 471. He was opposed to the Antiochene theology of the school of the Persians in Edessa and he successfully appealed to the Emperor Zeno to have it shut down. Its leading scholars, including Narsai, went into exile in Persia and founded the school of Nisibis. The date of this event is disputed. It took place either before 486 or, as per the Chronicle of Edessa, in 489. A church dedicated to the Theotokos was built on the site of the school, according to Simeon of Beth Arsham.

In the year 809 of the Seleucid era (either 496 or 497), during an outbreak of the "disease of tumours", Cyrus urged the people to make silver litter for carrying the Eucharistic vessels during the commemorations of martyrs. Eutychianus, husband of Aurelia, gave 100 denarii for its construction. The "disease of tumours", which is said to have made some blind, has not been securely identified. It may have been an early outbreak of bubonic plague before the first pandemic began in the 540s.

According to the Chronicle of Pseudo-Joshua the Stylite, Cyrus died on 5 June 498 (Seleucid 809) and was succeeded by Peter. The chronicle gives him the Syriac title mar (saint, reverend).
