= Arthur Frothingham =

American archaeologist (1859–1923)

Arthur Lincoln Frothingham, Jr. (June 21, 1859 – July 1923) was an early professor of art history at Princeton University and an archaeologist.

== Biography ==
Frothingham was born in Boston, Massachusetts, and came from a wealthy family background, which allowed him to study languages at the Catholic Seminary of San Apollinare in Rome and the Royal University of Rome between 1868 and 1881. In 1882, he began teaching Semitic languages at Johns Hopkins University. He completed his doctorate in Germany, at the University of Leipzig in 1883, and he married Helen Bulkley Post. In 1884, he was secretary of the newly founded Archaeological Institute of America. In 1885, with Princeton professor Allan Marquand, he co-founded the American Journal of Archaeology, the journal of the Institute, and became the first editor. He remained editor of the Journal until 1896.

Frothingham lectured at Princeton when it was still known as the College of New Jersey (1885). In 1886, he became a professor there, teaching art history and archaeology, although it is rumored that he took no salary at first. Among his courses were offerings in renaissance art history, among the first post-classical art courses taught at the College. Together with Allan Marquand, Frothingham worked to rewrite Moritz Carrière's Bilder Atlas as a fourth volume of the Iconographic Encyclopedia (1887). About 1890, Frothingham and Marquand began to have major difficulties working together, perhaps stemming from the overlap in their areas of expertise and teaching. Frothingham taught his renaissance course (which was largely medieval monuments) for the last time in 1892-93.

During the 1890s, Frothingham became the associate director of the American Academy in Rome, a position that largely involved directing visitors and acting as an agent for American museums. In this capacity, he acquired twenty-nine Etruscan tomb groups excavated by Francesco Mancinelli at Narce as well as from other sites. Frothingham also studied the topography of Latium and was interested in an excavation at the site of Norba, but he was not granted a permit for fieldwork.

Back at Princeton, Frothingham was innovative in the curriculum. He added a famous course that he called "Subjects and Symbols in Early Christian Art," which would serve as the prototype for iconographic studies for which Princeton would later become famous. When Marquand returned from a year at the American Academy in Rome, he found that Frothingham was teaching yet another new course: Italian art of the Middle Ages. Marquand was unhappy with this, and since he controlled the salaries of art historians who were paid from the Frederic Marquand Bequest, he stopped Frothingham's salary mid-semester.

The university's president Francis Landey Patton paid Frothingham for the rest of the semester and reconfigured Frothingham's position as one of ancient art and archaeology, but stripped him of the ability to teach medieval art or be editor of the American Journal of Archaeology. Frothingham and Marquand co-wrote a textbook in 1896, A Textbook of the History of Sculpture. Frothingham remained professor of ancient history and archaeology at Princeton until 1906. In 1903-04, however, his thinly-disguised medieval course, now lasting two full semesters, caused trouble with university officials. His name was removed from the faculty rolls the following year, and though he remained in the city of Princeton, New Jersey, the rest of his life, publishing as a private scholar, he never again taught.

In 1895-96, Frothingham was an associate director of the American School of Classical Studies at Rome. He prepared articles on architecture for the New International Encyclopedia. In the years after World War I, Frothingham studied the issues of immigrant populations in the United States, testifying at the Lusk hearings in Washington D.C.. Toward the end of his life, he traveled to Italy to study fascism. He died in New York City of heart disease.

== Bibliography ==
- Frothingham, Arthur L. (1925). The Monuments of Christian Rome from Constantine to the Renaissance. Handbooks of Archaeology and Antiquities. New York: Macmillan. LCCN 08036410.
- Frothingham, Arthur L.; Marquand, Allan (1911). A Text-Book of the History of Sculpture (New ed.). New York: Longmans, Green. LCCN 11029719.
- Sturgis, Russell (1906–1915). A History of Architecture. New York: Baker & Taylor. LCCN 06045368. Sturgis wrote the first two volumes of the series and Frothingham the final two:
  - Frothingham, A. L. (1915). A History of Architecture. Vol. 3, Gothic in Italy, France, and Northern Europe. Garden City, N.Y.: Doubleday, Page.
  - Frothingham, A. L. (1915). A History of Architecture. Vol. 4, Gothic in Great Britain, Renaissance, Modern Architecture. Garden City, N.Y.: Doubleday, Page.
- Frothingham, Arthur L. (1888). "Part II: Early Christian, Mediæval, and Renaissance Architecture". In Lockington, W. N. (ed.). The Iconographic Encyclopaedia of the Arts and Sciences; Translated from the German of the Bilder-atlas (Iconograpische Encyclopædie), Revised and Enlarged by Eminent American Specialists. Vol. 4, Architecture. Philadelphia: Iconographic Publishing. pp. 97–286.
- Frothingham, A. L. (1886). Stephen bar Sudaili, the Syrian mystic, and the book of Hierotheos. Leyden: E. J. Brill. LCCN 84107920. Commentary on Stephen bar Sudayli's Book of Secrets.
