= Gilduin of Le Puiset =

Monk, prior, and abbot

Gilduin of Le Puiset (d. between 1130 and 1135) was the son of Hugh I of Le Puiset and Alice of Montlhéry, daughter of Guy I of Montlhéry. Monk at St. Martin-des-Champs, prior at Cluny Abbey, prior at Lurey-le-Bourg, abbot of St. Mary of the Valley of Jehosaphat.

It is unclear when Gilduin became abbot of St. Mary, but he was in this position when his cousin Baldwin II confirmed the privileges of the abbey, the chief Marian shrine in Jerusalem, on 31 January 1120.

In that same year, Gilduin and Baldwin II travelled to Edessa, joining with Gilduin’s brother Waleran. There they met Hugh, Archbishop of Edessa. Hugh, in possession of two sacred relics — a finger of St. Stephen and a tooth of John the Baptist - was concerned about keeping the relics in a place that could be overrun by Moslems. He gave the relics to Gilduin for transfer to Cluny, now under Pons of Melgueil, a mission which he completed.

Gilduin may have been associated with Barisan the Old. Les Lignages d’Outremer identified Balian [Barisan] as the brother of a Count Guilduin of Chartres. Riley-Smith speculates that Barisan may have been the illegitimate brother or brother-in-law of Gilduin, but there is little evidence to support this.

It is not known who succeeded Gilduin as abbot of St. Mary.

== Bibliography ==
- Riley-Smith, Jonathan, The First Crusaders, 1095-1131, Cambridge University Press, London, 1997
- Nielen, Marie-Adélaïde, Lignages d’Outremer. Paris, Académie des inscriptions et belles-lettres 2003
- Morris, Paul N., Roasting the Pig: A Vision of Cluny, Cockaigne and the Treatise of García of Toled, Dissertation, UCLA, 2001 (archive)
