= Cyrus I of Edessa =

4th century Christian bishop of Edessa

Cyrus I (died 396) was the bishop of Edessa succeeding Eulogius, who died on Good Friday 387 (year 698 of the Seleucid era).

According to the Chronicle of Edessa, on 22 August 394 (705) Cyrus moved the relics (bones) of Thomas the Apostle from a martyrium outside the city walls to a church in the southwest corner of the city.

Cyrus died on 22 July 396 (707). The story of Euphemia and the Goth is set during the pontificate of Cyrus.
