= Book of Secrets (Syriac) =

Syriac treatise

The Book of Secrets, fully the Book of Hierotheus on the Hidden Mysteries of the House of God, is a Syriac treatise which survives in a single manuscript copied in the 13th century (now British Library, Add MS 7189). The work is pseudonymous and its author is conventionally known as Pseudo-Hierotheus. He has been tentatively identified with Stephen bar Sudayli.

== Date and authorship ==
The work claims to have been composed in the 1st century AD, by a certain Hierotheus who was the disciple of Saint Paul and the teacher of Dionysius the Areopagite. But, like the works which pass under the name of Dionysius, it is undoubtedly pseudonymous, and most Syriac writers who mention it attribute it to Stephen. The author of the Book of Hierotheus is sometimes referred to as Pseudo-Hierotheus as his follower, Dionysius the Areopagite, is called Pseudo-Dionysius the Areopagite to differentiate them from the biblical figures.

== Summary ==
A discussion and summary of the book were given by Arthur Frothingham (Stephen bar Sudhaili, Leiden, 1886), but the text was not edited until F. S. Marsh's edition of 1927. From Frothingham's analysis we learn that the work consists of five books; after briefly describing the origin of the world by emanation from the Supreme Good it is mainly occupied with the description of the stages by which the mind returns to union with God, who finally becomes all in all. To describe the contents in a few words: at the beginning we find the statement regarding absolute existence, and the emanation from primordial essence of the spiritual and material universes: then comes, what occupies almost the entire work, the experience of the mind in search of perfection during this life. Finally comes the description of the various phases of existence as the mind rises into complete union with, and ultimate absorption into, the primitive essence. The keynote to the experience of the mind is its absolute identification with Christ; but the son finally resigns the kingdom unto the Father, and all distinct existence comes to an end, being lost in the chaos of the Good (Frothingham, p. 92).

One of the most distinguishing features of the work is the skill with which the language of the Bible is interpreted along the lines of his pantheistic theology. In this and other respects the book harmonizes well with the picture of Stephens teaching afforded by the letter of Philoxenus to the Edessene priests Abraham and Orestes (Frothingham, pp. 28–48). The Book of Hierotheus is probably an original Syriac work, and not translated from Greek. Its relation to the Pseudo-Dionysian literature is a difficult question; probably Frothingham (p. 83) goes too far in suggesting that it was prior to all the pseudo-Dionysian writings (cf. Ryssel in Zeitschrift für Kirchengeschichte).

== Surviving manuscripts ==
The unique manuscript in which the Book of Hierotheus survives furnishes along with its text the commentary made upon it by Theodosius, Patriarch of Antioch (887–896), who appears to have sympathized with its teaching. A rearrangement and abridgment of the work was made by the great Miaphysite author Bar Hebraeus (1226–1286), who expunged or garbled much of its unorthodox teaching. The copy that he used is the manuscript which now survives in the British Library.
