= John Gerald Neville =

Catholic bishop

John Gerald Neville C.S.Sp.
- Vicar Apostolic of Zanzibar
- Church: Catholic Church
- Diocese: Apostolic Vicariate of Zanzibar
- In office: 1 September 1913 – 8 March 1930
- Predecessor: Emil August Allgeyer
- Successor: John William Heffernan
- Other post: Titular Bishop of Carrhae (1913-1943)

Orders
- Ordination: 1 November 1885 by François-Marie Duboin
- Consecration: 28 October 1913 by Patrick O'Donnell

Personal details
- Born: 29 October 1858 Dublin, County Dublin, United Kingdom of Great Britain and Ireland
- Died: 27 February 1943 (aged 84)

John Gerald Neville, DD, C.S.Sp. (29 October 1858 – 27 February 1943), was an Irish-born priest, a member of the Holy Ghost Fathers, who served in Africa.

== Life ==
Born in Dublin in 1858, he was educated at Blackrock College, Dublin and in France where he was ordained a priest in the Missions’ Seminary, Chapel, Chevilly, in 1885. He worked at Blackrock College until 1903.

In 1913, Neville was ordained Titular Bishop of Carrhae in Blackrock College's chapel, the first such ordination in the college. Bishop Neville was also appointed Apostolic Vicar of Zanzibar, (then administered from Kenya), from 1913 until 1931 when aged 72 he resigned but remained Apostolic administrator until 1943 when he died. He was succeeded in 1932 as Vicar Apostolic by another Irishman, John William Heffernan.

Neville was also a trained doctor, and the Bishop John Neville, C.S.Sp. Medical Dispensary in Mbokombu, Mosbi, Tanzania is named in his honour.
