= Diocese of Harran =

Harran (ancient Carrhae) was a Christian bishopric centered on the city of Harran (situated in south-eastern modern Turkey).

== History ==
=== Early Christianity ===
Christianity likely reached Harran through Edessa in the first century AD, but no bishops are known with certainty until the fourth century. The first known bishop was a certain Barses, who was later transferred to the see of Edessa in 360/1 at the order of Constantius II, and Ephraim referred to the Church at Carrhae as "the daughter of Barses", implying that Barses was the first bishop of the city. Occasionally Archelaus of Carchar is named as the first bishop as Carchar has been sometimes identified with Carrhae due to its geographic location, but this has been questioned by some scholars such as S.N.C. Lieu.

The pilgrim Egeria visited Harran in 384, at which point there was little Christian population though the city had a monk-bishop, most likely who showed her a church at the presumed place of Abraham's house as well as a spring identified with Rebecca's well. Ibas of Edessa, bishop of Edessa, made his nephew Daniel bishop of Harran in the mid-fifth century. Of its bishops, Vitus (also Pitus) participated in the Council of Constantinople in 381 and John at the Council of Chalcedon in 451.

=== Christianity in Medieval times ===
In the Notitia Antiochena from the 580s, Harran is noted as a suffragan seat of Edessa. There were churches and later also bishops by the Melkite, Nestorian and the Syriac Orthodox Church at various times, often overlapping. Pagan presence in the city continued as well, but decreased over time; Abu al-Hasan al-Mas’udi mentioned one remaining temple in 943 and it is possible it survived into the twelfth century.

Simeon of the Olives, the Syriac Orthodox bishop of the city, participated at the synod of Manzikert (726). The Syriac Orthodox Patriarch Quryaqos, who had been consecrated in Harran on 17 August 793, convened a synod in Harran in 812/13 where 26 canons were issued.

The Beth Batin Monastery, which produced one Patriarch and three bishops, was located near Harran and remained active until 975.

The last known Syriac Orthodox bishop was a certain Ephrem, who is mentioned when a group of Armenians petitioned access to an altar in the Syriac church of Harran in 1252. Among the ruins of the medieval town of Harran are also those of a large basilica church in the northeastern end.

=== Catholic Titular See ===
The diocese was later revived as a titular see for the Catholic Church, with the first titular bishop being a certain Giovanni Battista de Capua in 1729.

== List of bishops ==
=== Early Christianity bishops ===
- Barses (? - 360/1)
- Abgbar (361 – 370)
- Vitus (371 – 381)
- Protogenes (fl. 383)
- Abraham (? – 422)
- Daniel I (fl. 444 - 449)
- John/Yuhanna I (449 – 458)
- Eustratonicus (c. 500)

=== Syriac Orthodox Church bishops ===
- Mor Youhanon II (519)
- Anonymous Bishop
- Sergius bar Karya (544/45 – 580)
- Stephen (589)
- Shim’un I (620)
- Daniel II (627)
- Mor Isidore
- Mor Lazarus
- Domet (685)
- Elia bar Gufne (died 700)
- Simeon of the Olives (700 – June 734)
- Thomas (734 – 738)
- Iwannis (before 740)
- Simon (745)
- Theomarice (752)
- Isaac, the alchemist (754)
- Dionysius I(758-762)
- Dionysius II
- Quriaqus martyr (770)
- Theodosius (775)
- Iwannis (789-805)
- Isaac (752 – 755)
- Dionysius I(758-7 762)
- Dionysius II
- Quriaqus, the martyr (770)
- Theodosius (775)
- Iywannis (789-805)
- Georges I
- Georges II (816-850)
- David (850–880)
- Anonymous ordained before 869 by the metropolitan of Takrit
- Constantine (878-883)
- Youhannon (896-909 to 932)
- Ignatius (910-922)
- Philoxenus (936-953)
- Timothy (962-963)
- Theodosius (965-986)
- Petros (fl. 1004)
- Basilius I (1028-1063)
- Timothy II (1064-1088)
- Basilius II (1088-1120)
- Ignatius II (1120-1150)
- Timothy III (1150-1174)
- Ignatius III (1184-1186)
- Iywannis II Jacob (1222-?) was also known as Jacob Bar Shakko, author of anaphora and metropolitan of Harran, Khabur, Nisibis and Djazira
- Ephrem (fl. 1252)

=== Church of the East bishops ===
- Habib ibn Bahriz (early ninth century)

=== Melkite Church bishops ===
- Theodore Abu Qurrah (died ca. 825)

=== Titular bishops ===
- Giovanni Battista de Capua (1729.03.23 – ?)
- João José Vaz Pereira (1821.06.27 – 1830.05.04)
- Pietro-Raffaele Arduino, O.F.M. Conv. (1838.09.25 – 1843.01.30)
- Patrick Phelan, P.S.S. (1843.02.20 – 1857.05.08)
- Albert von Haller (1858.03.18 – 1858.11.28)
- Johannes Baptiste Kutschker (1862.04.07 – 1876.04.15)
- Anton Josef Gruscha (1878.03.28 – 1890.06.23)
- Ferdinand Cselka (1893.01.19 – 1897.03.07)
- John Gerald Neville, C.S.Sp. (1913.09.01 – 1943.02.27)
- José de la Cruz Turcios y Barahona, S.D.B. (later Archbishop) (1943.05.28 – 1947.12.08)
- Manuel Marengo (1950.02.20 – 1956.09.22)
- Joseph Louis André Ouellette (1956.11.29 – 1965.03.27)

== See also ==
- Harran (biblical place)

== Bibliography ==
- Barsoum, Aphrem (2003). Moosa, Matti (transl.) (ed.). The Scattered Pearls A History Of Syriac Literature And Sciences. Gorgias Press.
- Barsoum, Aphrem (2009). "Bishops of the City of Harran". In Moosa, Matti (ed.). The Collected Historical Essays of Aphram I Barsoum. Gorgias Press. ISBN 978-1-60724-535-3.
- Hoyland, Robert G.; Brunner, Kyle B.; Tannous, Jack Boulos Victor (2021). The Life of Simeon of the Olives: An Entrepreneurial Saint of Early Islamic North Mesopotamia. Gorgias Press LLC. ISBN 978-1-4632-4346-3.
- King, Daniel (12 December 2018). The Syriac World. Routledge. ISBN 978-1-317-48211-6.
- Lenski, Noel Emmanuel (2002). Failure of Empire: Valens and the Roman State in the Fourth Century A.D. University of California Press. ISBN 978-0-520-23332-4.
- Lieu, S. N. C. (25 August 2015). Manichaeism in Mesopotamia and the Roman East. BRILL. pp. 141–142. ISBN 978-90-04-29581-0.
- Palmer, Andrew (1990). Monk and Mason on the Tigris Frontier: The Early History of Tur Abdin. Cambridge University Press.
- Takahashi, Hidemi (2011). "Ḥarran". In Sebastian P. Brock; Aaron M. Butts; George A. Kiraz; Lucas Van Rompay (eds.). Gorgias Encyclopedic Dictionary of the Syriac Heritage: Electronic Edition.
- Vest, Bernd Andreas (2007). Geschichte der Stadt Melitene und der umliegenden Gebiete: vom Vorabend der arabischen bis zum Abschluss der türkischen Eroberung (um 600-1124) (in German). Dr. Kovač. ISBN 978-3-8300-2575-7.
