= Council of Capharthutha =

The Council of Capharthutha (also Kafartut or Kafr Tut) was a synod of the Syriac Orthodox Church held in February 869 AD under Patriarch John IV of Antioch. It was called to resolve the differences between the Patriarch of Antioch and the Maphrian of the East over their ecclesiastical jurisdiction in Mesopotamia and Persia. It aimed to regulate mutual relations and to resolve some difficulties that were frequently arising between two centers.

== Canons ==
The assembly codified eight canons preserved in Bar Hebraeus' 13th-century nomocanon, the Kthobo d-Hudoye (Book of Guides):

1. The bishops and the monks in the Mar Mathai's Monastery, should submit to and obey the Maphrian whose seat is in Tikrit
2. The Patriarch should not interfere in the administration of the Church in Tikrit, unless when invited. In the same way the maphrian should not interfere in the Patriarchal See
3. When the Maphrian is present along with the Patriarch of Antioch he should be seated immediately at the right hand side of the Patriarch. The name of the Maphrian shall be mentioned immediately after that of the Patriarch, in the liturgy; and he should receive the Holy Qurobo after the Patriarch
4. When a Maphrian is alive, a Patriarch should not be installed without his concurrence, otherwise, the orientals shall have the right to install the Maphrian by themselves. The question of who should perform the laying on of hands on the new Patriarch - i.e., the Maphrian or the President of the Synod, shall be decided by four bishops, two each elected by the orientals and the westerners (Antiochan) respectively
5. The Archdiocese of Kurdu, Beth-Sabdaya and also Najran, provided, the Arabs agree to it, shall vest with Tigris administration
6. The mutual excommunications between the orientals and the Antiochans shall be withdrawn
7. A final decision was taken about the three bishops consecrated by the Patriarch in the see of the Maphrian
8. A bishop excommunicated by the Maphrian shall also be considered as excommunicated by the Patriarch

== Maphrian ==
The word Maphrian is an analogue of the Greek καθολικός (katholikos), meaning 'concerning the whole', 'universal' or 'general'. It was a title that existed in the Roman Empire where a government representative who was in charge of a large area was called a catholicos. The churches later started to use this term for their chief bishops.

Maphriyono ('Maphrian') is derived from the Syriac word afri, 'to make fruitful', or 'one who gives fecundity'. This title came to be used for the head of the Syriac Orthodox Church in the East from the eleventh-century onwards, who was previously often styled as the 'Metropolitan of Tikrit and the whole Orient' or 'Catholicos'.

According to one of the most famous Maphriyans, Mar Gregorios Bar Ebraya (Bar Hebraeus), the Apostle Thomas was the first in the Apostolic succession of the East. Bar Ebraya did not believe that the Eastern Church was an integral part of the Antiochian Church, due to the historical context of the time in which he lived. He did, however, vigorously defend his rights, as dictated by the church canons.

== Sources ==
- Barsoum, Aphrem (2003). The Scattered Pearls: A History of Syriac Literature and Sciences. Translated by Matti Moosa (2nd rev. ed.). Gorgias Press.
- Dinno, Khalid (2017). "The Synods and Canons in the Syrian (Syriac) Orthodox Church in the Second Millennium: An Overview". Journal of the Canadian Society for Syriac Studies. 17: 21–36. doi:10.31826/9781463238940-003. ISBN 978-1-4632-3894-0.
- Wood, Philip (2021). The Imam of the Christians: The World of Dionysius of Tel-Mahre, c. 750–850. Princeton University Press.
