= Hugh (archbishop of Edessa) =

Hugh or Hugo (died 24 December 1144) was the Latin Archbishop of Edessa from about 1120 until his death. He is sometimes called "Hugh II", although he is the only known Edessene bishop named Hugh. The chronicler Bar Hebraeus calls him "Papyas" and "the metropolitan of the Franks". Most of the Christians in his province would have been Armenians not in communion with Rome; they only recognized papal authority in 1145. Hugh defended his city during the siege of Edessa of 1144 while Count Joscelin II of Edessa was absent. He was killed when the city fell to Zengi, atabeg of Mosul.

Hugh was originally from Flanders. On his way to Jerusalem he stopped at the Abbey of Cluny and became an associate of the Cluniac order, being invested by Abbot Hugh with "the society of all the goods of the congregation", what the Flemish Hugh later called a "confraternity of prayer" with Cluny. In 1120, he donated some relics—a finger of Saint Stephen and a tooth of John the Baptist—to Cluny under Abbot Pons. According to an account of their donation, the Tractatus de Reliquiis Sancti Stephani Cluniacum Delatis, Hugh feared for his soul because he was keeping the holy relics in a city under constant threat of Muslim attack. Only after he was visited three times by the three patron saints of Cluny in visions that he mistook for dreams did Hugh decide to turn the relics over to Cluny. He gave them to Gilduin du Puiset, former prior of Cluny, who gave them to the monk Frotmund, who conveyed them to Cluny in a crystal glass casket. Hugh also acquired relics of Saints Thaddeus of Edessa and Abgar he sent to the archbishop of Reims, Ralph, in 1123. The letter Hugh addressed to the archbishop has survived, been edited and published. Hugh calls himself Hugo, Dei gratia Edessenae archiepiscopus, that is, archbishop "by the grace of God".

Hugh's diocese shrank sometime before 1134, when the Crusaders re-established the ancient Archdiocese of Hierapolis based on the city of Dülük, which they called La Tuluppe. Its territory was taken from that of Edessa.

On 28 November 1144, Zengi surrounded the walled city of Edessa while the ruling count was away with his army. In the absence of the ruler and the best fighting men, Archbishop Hugh was charged with the defence of the city. He had the loyal support of the Armenian bishop John and the Syriac bishop Basil. Later chroniclers, including William of Tyre, accused him of refusing to spend from his treasury to pay the arrears of his soldiers, and blame the city's fall on his avarice. Hugh also ordered the defenders of the citadel not to open the gates unless he arrived in person. After the walls had been breached on 24 December, dozens of citizens were crushed in the mad rush to the citadel as the gates remained shut. Hugh himself was killed either in the stampede or by Zengi's soldiers as he tried to reach the citadel.

== Sources ==
Catholic Church titles
Preceded by Benedict	Archbishop of Edessa c.1120–1144	Vacant
