= Joseph of Antioch =

52nd Patriarch of Syriac Orthodox Church of Antioch

Joseph
- Syriac Orthodox Patriarch of Antioch and All the East
- Church: Syriac Orthodox Church
- See: Antioch
- Installed: 790
- Term ended: 792
- Predecessor: George I
- Successor: Quriaqos of Tagrit

Joseph was the Patriarch of Antioch, and head of the Syriac Orthodox Church from 790 until he died in 792.

== Biography ==
Prior to his consecration as patriarch, Joseph was a monk at the Monastery of Gubba Baraya, near Mabbogh. According to Dionysius I Telmaharoyo, Joseph was elected as patriarch in 790 in fear of the Monastery of Gubba Baraya, which was powerful enough to cause serious disruption to the church. He is not considered to have been particularly intelligent as a result of his lack of education.

Soon after his consecration, Zachariah, former Bishop of Edessa, who had been removed due to complaints from local clergy, convinced Joseph to travel with him to the city to persuade locals to accept him as their bishop. The Syriac Orthodox population of Edessa, however, rejected Zachariah. Joseph served as patriarch until he died in 792 whilst visiting a monastery near Tell Beshmay.

== Bibliography ==
- Palmer, Andrew (1990). Monk and Mason on the Tigris Frontier: The Early History of Tur 'Abdin. Cambridge University Press. ISBN 9780521360265.

Preceded by George I	Syrian Orthodox Patriarch of Antioch; 790–792	Succeeded by Quriaqos of Tagrit
