= Eulogius of Edessa =

4th-century Bishop of Edessa

Saint Eulogius of Edessa Bishop of Edessa
- Born: 4th century
- Residence: Edessa
- Died: 387; Edessa (modern-day Şanlıurfa, Turkey)
- Feast: May 5 (Roman Catholic)

Saint Eulogius (Syriac: Walagash) was the Bishop of Edessa during the late 4th century A.D.

He was persecuted for his faith under the Roman emperors.

In 379 or 380 A.D., he built the House of Mar Daniel, a church in Edessa. He also attended the First Council of Constantinople in 381.

He died on Good Friday, 387 A.D. Cyrus I of Edessa succeeded him as Bishop of Edessa.

He is canonized as a saint by both Orthodox and Roman Catholic churches. His Roman Catholic feast day is May 5.
