= Abraham of Cyrrhus =

Hermit and bishop

Saint Abraham of Cyrrhus
- Born: c. 350; Cyrrhus (modern-day Syria)
- Died: 422; Constantinople (modern-day Istanbul, Turkey)
- Venerated in: Catholic Church (especially Maronite Church); Syriac Orthodox Church; Eastern Orthodox Church
- Feast: February 14

Saint Abraham (Cyrrhus, Syria, c. 350–Constantinople, 422) (also known as Abraames, Abraham of Charres and Abraham the Apostle of Lebanon was a Syrian hermit and bishop of Harran.

== Life ==
Abraham was born and educated at Carrhae (modern Harran) in Syria, and preached the Gospel in the valley of Mount Lebanon, where he lived as a hermit. His life was described by Theodoret of Cyr (393-466 A.D.), the Bishop of Cyrrhus, who named him among the other thirty religious men and women in his book "Historia Religiosa" (Religious History).

He spent the first part of his life in the desert of Chalcis where he lived an ascetic life, he tried his body by fasting and still standing and was so exhausted that could not move. But then he left for Lebanon as a merchant and helped the inhabitants of the village where he stayed to pay the taxes with the help of his friends. The name of the village is not known but it is believed to be Aqura- Afka. "It was probably located in Aqura near the river Adonis." He was asked by the villagers to become their tutor and he accepted providing they would build the Christian church. He stayed in this village for three years as a priest and then returned to his ascetic life as a hermit.

He was later elected bishop of Harran in Mesopotamia (Carrhae), where he worked vigorously to reduce the existing abuses. He died in Constantinople in 422 after going there to consult with Theodosius II, although some argue that it may have instead occurred in 390 under Theodosius II's predecessor, Theodosius I. His body was transferred back to Harran, to the city of Antioch where he was buried. His feast day is 14 February.

According to Alban Butler,

He was a holy solitary, who, going to preach to an idolatrous village on Mount Libanus, overcame the persecutions of the heathens by meekness and patience. When he had narrowly escaped death from their hands, he borrowed money, wherewith to satisfy the demands of the collectors of the public taxes, for their failure in which respect they were to be cast into prison; and by this charity, he gained them all to Christ. After instructing them for three years, he left them in the care of a holy priest and returned to his desert.

He was some time after the ordained bishop of Carres, in Mesopotamia, which country he cleared of idolatry, dissensions, and other vices. He joined the recollection and penance of a monk with the labors of his functions, and died at Constantinople, in 422, having been sent for to court by Theodosius the Younger, and there treated with the greatest honor on account of his sanctity. That emperor kept one of his mean garments, and wore it himself on certain days, out of respect.

== See also ==
- Abraham River
- Afqa
- Aqoura
