= Habib ibn Bahriz =

Bishop of the Church of the East (fl. 9th c.)

Ḥabīb ibn Bahrīz (Note: Arabic: حبيب بن بهريز) (fl. early 9th century), also called ʿAbdishoʿ bar Bahrīz, (Note: Syriac: ܥܒܕܝܫܘܥ ܒܪ ܒܗܪܝܙ; Arabic: عبد يشوع بن بهريز, ʿAbd Īshūʿ ibn Bahrīz) was a bishop and scholar of the Church of the East, famous for his translations from Syriac into Arabic. He also wrote original works on logic, canon law and apologetics.

Ibn Bahrīz was probably born in the mid to late 8th century. His place of birth is unknown. He was a contemporary of the Abbasid caliph al-Maʾmūn (r. 813–833) and the physician Jibrīl ibn Bukhtīshūʿ. He may have died shortly before Ibn Bukhtīshūʿ's own death in 827. He was of Persian descent, as indicated by his father's name, Bahrīz. His own given name was Ḥabīb, while ʿAbdishoʿ ('servant of Jesus') was a religious name he took upon entering the church. He served as the bishop of Ḥarrān and later as metropolitan of Mosul and Ḥazza. According to al-Jāḥiz, he had ambitions of becoming catholicos, but the Muslim writer comments mockingly that he lacked the requisite height, voice or lengthy beard.

Ibn Bahrīz was an early translator in the Graeco-Syro-Arabic translation movement. According to Ibn al-Nadīm, Ibn Bahrīz wrote summaries of Aristotle's Categories and On Interpretation, translated many philosophical works into Arabic and wrote commentaries on the classics for al-Maʾmūn. The caliph also commissioned an Arabic treatise on logic, Kitāb ḥudūd al-manṭiq ('Definitions of Logic'), which Ibn Bahrīz based on the Categories and Porphyry's Isagoge. Ibn Bahrīz was also connected with other Abbasid elites. He translated Nicomachus of Gerasa's Introduction to Arithmetic from Syriac into Arabic for Ṭāhir ibn al-Ḥusayn. He also translated works of medicine for Ibn Bukhtīshūʿ.

Ibn Bahrīz also wrote works in defence of his church's Christology, including one directed against two Jacobite works. Ibn al-Nadīm wrote that "his wisdom was close to the wisdom of Islam", because he defended the "oneness of hypostasis" against the doctrine of the Jacobites and Melkites. One apologetic treatise by Ibn Bahrīz is known, entitled Maqāla fī l-tawḥīd wa-l-tathlīth ('Treatise on the Unity and Trinity'). It is a defence of the Trinity and an argument that it does not imply Tritheism. It is preserved in two manuscripts in private collections in Aleppo and has never been published. His handbook on canon law relating to marriage and inheritance, written in Syriac, has been published. According to ʿAbdishoʿ bar Brikha, he also wrote an "explanation of the different church services".

Ibn Bahrīz is probably the "ʿAbdīshūʿ, the Nestorian mutrān [metropolitan]" who took part in a public debate or discussion of different Christologies in the 820s before an unnamed Muslim vizier. There is a short record of this event in Arabic by an anonymous author, probably a Jacobite, which has been titled A Christological Discussion by its editor. It is preserved in three manuscripts. The Melkite and Jacobite participants—Theodore Abū Qurra and Abū Rāʾita al-Takrītī, respectively—are well known.

== Editions ==
Only two works by Ibn Bahrīz have been published, his Syriac lawbook and his Arabic treatise on logic.

- Walter Selb, ʿAbḏīšōʿ bar Bahrīz, Ordnung der Ehe und der Erbschaften sowie Entscheidung von Rechtsfällen (Hermann Böhlaus, 1970).
- M. T. Dānishpazhūh, al-Manṭq li-Ibn al-Muqaffaʿ wa Ḥudūd al-manṭiq li-Ibn Bihrīz (Anjumân-i Shâhanshâhi Falsafah-i Iran, 1978).

A Christological Discussion has been edited and translated into English:

- Sandra Toenies Keating, Defending the "People of Truth" in the Early Islamic Period: The Christian Apologies of Abū Rāʾiṭah (Brill, 2006), pp. 347–351 (analysis), 352–357 (text).
