= Aitalaha =

4th-century Bishop of Edessa

Aitalaha Bishop of Edessa
- Born: late 3rd century
- Residence: Edessa
- Died: 345; Edessa (modern-day Şanlıurfa, Turkey)

Aitalaha was the Bishop of Edessa from 324/5 AD to 345/6 AD.

== Spellings ==
He is also known as Aeithales, Ethilaos, Ethalas, Aithilaha, Aithalas, Aitallaha, Aithalla, Euthalius, Aeithilas, Ethalaha, or Absalom of Edessa.

== Life ==
He was a deacon in Edessa when Licinius (fl. 308–324) was the Roman emperor.

Shortly after succeeding Sa'ad as Bishop of Edessa, he was one of the presiding members of the First Council of Nicaea in 325.

He died in 345 and was succeeded by Abraham of Edessa.
