= Ammar al-Basri =

Ammar al-Basri (Arabic: عمار البصري, ʿAmmār al-Baṣrī) was a 9th-century East Syriac theologian and apologist. Ammar's work is considered the first systematic Christian theology in Arabic. Not much is known about his life except that he was a native of Basra.

== Works ==
Several books two of them survived:

- The book of proof (كتاب البرهان، Kitāb al-burhān), which deals with the incarnation in a popular albeit creative and vigorous language.
- The book of questions and answers (كتاب المسائل والأجوبة, Kitāb al-masāʾiI wa-l-ajwiba), is more systematic and in treats in four sections questions regarding the existence of God, the Incarnation, the four Gospels and other topics.

== See also ==
- Abu Raita al-Takriti
- Theodore Abu-Qurrah
