= John David (archbishop of Edessa) =

Armenian Catholic prelate (from 1343)

John David was the Armenian Catholic archbishop of Edessa from 1343. He was a member of the Order of Friars Unitors of Armenia and a monk at the famous church of Zorzor. (The exact location of Zorzor is unknown; it may be the monastery of Saint Thaddeus in present-day Iran.)

John David's predecessor, Martin, also a Unitor, died in 1342 while visiting the Avignonese curia. Pope Clement VI appointed John David to succeed him on 30 May 1343.
