= Basil of Cilicia =

5th century Christian historian

Basil or Basilius (Ancient Greek: Βασιλείος) or Βασίλιος) of Cilicia was the author of a history of the Church in three books, called Ecclesiastical History, of which Photios I of Constantinople gives a short account. Photius considered him a Nestorian.

Basil also wrote a work against John of Scythopolis, and one against Archelaus, bishop of Carrhae. He lived under the emperor Anastasius I Dicorus, was presbyter at Antioch about 497 CE, and afterwards bishop of Irenopolis.
