= George of Beltan =

51st Patriarch of Syriac Orthodox Church of Antioch (758 - 790)

George I of Antioch
- Syriac Orthodox Patriarch of Antioch and All the East
- Church: Syriac Orthodox Church
- See: Antioch
- Installed: 758
- Term ended: 790
- Predecessor: Athanasius Sandalaya
- Successor: Joseph

Personal details
- Died: 1 December 790 Monastery of Mar Bar Sawma

Sainthood
- Feast day: 7 December
- Venerated in: Syriac Orthodox Church

George of Beltan (Syriac: ܡܪܝ ܓܝܘܪܓܝܣ ܕܒܥܠܬܐܢ, Mor Gewargis d-Bʿeltan) was the Patriarch of Antioch (as George I) and head of the Syriac Orthodox Church from 758 until his death in 789 or 790.

== Biography ==
George was born in Baltan, near Emesa, in modern-day Syria into a family of Melkites. He became a Jacobite and studied Syriac and Greek at the Monastery of Qenneshre, as well as philology, theology, and jurisprudence. Here he was later ordained as a deacon.

In December 758, a synod was held in Mabbogh to elect a new patriarch, however, a consensus could not be reached and George was imposed as patriarch. John, bishop of Raqqa, and other bishops of Mesopotamia, did not recognise George as patriarch and John was elected patriarch. The Caliph al-Mansur supported John and thus George was prohibited from residing at the patriarchal seat at Antioch and resided at several monasteries during this time. John continued to pose as patriarch until his death in 762/763 AD.

In 764/765 AD, a synod was held at Serug to attempt to heal the division within the church. Negotiations were unsuccessful as George refused to recognise the bishops consecrated by John of Raqqa whilst posing as patriarch. From 765 to 766, George resided at the Monastery of Zuqnîn near Amid. A meeting was held in 766 between the two camps in the palace of the Caliph al-Mansur and David of Dara was appointed patriarch by the Caliph. George was imprisoned in Baghdad alongside the Nestorian Catholicos Jacob II, Theodore, the Greek Orthodox Patriarch of Antioch, and Sliba-zkha, Nestorian bishop of Tirhan.

In 767 AD, an agreement between George and Sliba-skha was made by which the Nestorians were permitted to build a church outside the walls of Tagrit, a predominantly Syriac Orthodox town, and in return, the Syriac Orthodox church of Mar Domitius in Nisibis would be allowed to be restored. Whilst George was imprisoned, David of Dara expelled George's supporters and imposed his authority on the church with the help of the Muslim authorities. David became increasingly unpopular within the Syriac Orthodox church and many of the bishops he appointed were rejected by their dioceses and driven out.

Upon the accession of the Caliph al-Mahdi in 775, George was released and was forbidden from using his title and performing his duties as patriarch by the Muslim authorities, but this was not enforced. David of Dara's unpopularity ensured that George was well received within the church and was considered the legitimate patriarch by the majority of the church. The monastery of Qartmin, former home to David of Dara, refused to acknowledge George as late as 784/785. Following his release, George travelled to Antioch in 775 where he ordained 10 bishops.

In subsequent years, bishops appointed by David of Dara were removed and George's supporters were restored. In 785, George deposed John II Keeyunoyo, Maphrian of the East, for his role in organising the opposition. In the same year, George held a synod at Kafr Nabu, near Serug, and enacted 22 canons. A debate on the phrase "heavenly bread" in connection with the Eucharist emerged during George's tenure, which was considered heretical as it implied a division in of the person of Christ. George refused to forbid the use of the phrase, however, as he was aware that this would lead to a schism within the church as it would later do during the tenure of Patriarch Quriaqos of Tagrit. George died on 1 December 790 and was buried at the Mor Bar Sauma Monastery, near Melitene.

== Response to the Charge of Taḥrīf ==
George addressed the Muslim charge of biblical falsification (taḥrīf) in chapter 49 of the introduction to his Commentary on the Gospel of Matthew. This previously unidentified Syriac text is notable for its early date and comprehensive treatment of the issue. It contains some of the earliest quotations of the Qur’ān in Syriac, possibly the first, and presents the earliest known version of the “True Religion Apology,” a discourse that later became prominent in Arabic Christian apologetic literature but is rare in Syriac sources. George’s response demonstrates the early Syriac engagement with interreligious debates and provides insight into the development of Christian apologetic thought in the 8th century.

== Sources ==
- George I, Patriarch of Antioch (d. 790)
- Andrew Palmer, Monk and Mason on the Tigris Frontier: The Early History of Tur `Abdin (1990)
- An Early Syriac Response to the Charge of Taḥrīf in George of Bʿeltan’s Commentary on the Gospel of Matthew

Preceded by Athanasius Sandalaya	Syrian Orthodox Patriarch of Antioch; 758–790	Succeeded by Joseph
