= Tarsus (West Syriac diocese) =

The city of Tarsus was a Syriac Orthodox archdiocese, attested between the seventh and thirteenth centuries. Nearly twenty Syriac Orthodox metropolitans of Tarsus are mentioned either by Michael the Syrian or in other Syriac Orthodox narrative sources. The archdiocese is last mentioned towards the end of the thirteenth century, and seems to have lapsed during the fourteenth century.

== Sources ==
The main primary source for the Syriac Orthodox metropolitans of Tarsus is the record of episcopal consecrations appended to Volume III of the Chronicle of the Syriac Orthodox patriarch Michael the Syrian (1166–99). In this Appendix Michael listed most of the bishops consecrated by the Syriac Orthodox patriarchs of Antioch between the ninth and twelfth centuries. Twenty-eight Syriac Orthodox patriarchs sat during this period, and in many cases Michael was able to list the names of the bishops consecrated during their reigns, their monasteries of origin, and the place where they were consecrated. For the thirteenth century, Michael's lists are supplemented by several references in other Syriac Orthodox narrative sources.

== Location ==
Tarsus, famed in Christian tradition as the birthplace of Saint Paul, was the metropolis of the Chalcedonian ecclesiastical province of Cilicia Prima. It was an obvious site for a Syriac Orthodox diocese, and may have been the seat of a Syriac Orthodox bishop or metropolitan as early as the sixth century.

== Metropolitans of Tarsus ==
The earliest-known Syriac Orthodox metropolitan of Tarsus was Yohannan bar ʿEbrayta ('son of the Jew'), who consecrated the patriarch Severus bar Mashqe in 668.

Sixteen Syriac Orthodox metropolitans of Tarsus from the end of the eighth century to the end of the twelfth century are mentioned in the lists of Michael the Syrian.

Name	From	Consecrated in the reign of	Place of consecration
Athanasius	not known	Quriaqos (793–817)	Harran
Gabriel	Monastery of Mar Shlemun	Quriaqos (793–817)	not known
Habib	not known	Quriaqos (793–817)	not known
Anastasius	Monastery of Saphylos	Yohannan III (847–74)	not known
Laʿzar	Monastery of the Easterners	Yohannan III (847–74)	not known
Laʿzar	'The great monastery of Samosata'	Theodosius Romanus (887–95)	not known
Cyril	Monastery of Bizona	Dionysius II (896–909)	not known
Athanasius	not known	Dionysius II (896–909)	not known
Athanasius	not known	Yohannan V (936–53)	not known
Jeremy	not known	Yohannan V (936–53)	not known
Paul	Monastery of Modiq	Athanasius IV Laʿzar (987–1003)	not known
Athanasius	Monastery of Mar Sargis and Mar Bacchus	Yohannan VII Bar ʿAbdon (1004–30)	not known
Abraham	Monastery of Nahra of Callinicus	Yohannan VII Bar ʿAbdon (1004–30)	not known
Basil	not known	Yohannan bar ʿAbdon (1042–57)	not known
Timothy	Monastery of Habib	Athanasius VI bar Khamara (1091–1129)	not known
Yohannan	Monastery of Dovair	Michael I (1166–99)	not known

Further details for this period are provided in Michael’s narrative and in other Syriac Orthodox narrative sources. The metropolitan Habib of Tarsus (793/817) consecrated the patriarch Yohannan III in 847. The metropolitan Athanasius of Tarsus (896/909) consecrated the patriarch Yohannan V in 936. The metropolitan Athanasius of Tarsus, consecrated in the reign of the patriarch Dionysius IV Heheh (1032–42), is apparently mentioned by Michael the Syrian, though he does not feature in Michael’s lists. The metropolitan Basil of Tarsus (1042/57) was the secretary of the patriarch Yohannan bar ʿAbdon.

The archdiocese of Tarsus evidently continued to flourish into the thirteenth century, though there are only two brief references to its metropolitans. The metropolitan Athanasius of Tarsus was present at a synod held in 1264. The metropolitan Yohannan of Tarsus, 'from the monastery of Mar Hnanya', was among the fifteen bishops consecrated by the patriarch Philoxenus Nemrud (1283–92).

The archdiocese of Tarsus is not mentioned in any later source, and probably lapsed during the fourteenth century.

== See also ==
- Tarsus, Mersin
