= Abu Raita al-Takriti =

Abu Raita al-Takriti (Arabic: حبيب ابن خدمة أبو رائطة التكريتي, Ḥabīb ibn Khidma Abū Rāʾiṭa l-Takrītī), was a 9th-century Syriac Orthodox theologian and apologist.

== Biography ==
Little is known about Abu Raita's life, and although some sources portray him as a bishop of Tikrit there is no contemporary evidence to support this. Abu Raita referred to himself as a "teacher" (Classical Syriac: ܡܠܦܢܐ malfono). It appears that his reputation as a theologian made him so well known that he was recalled to defend his fellow non-Chalcedonian co-religionists in Armenia.

Armenian tradition mentions that Abu Raita was recalled by the prince Ashot Msaker to defend the miaphysite against the Melkite teachings of Theodore Abū Qurra who was on a missionary activity in Armenia. Abu Raita was unable to travel to Armenia but sent his relative Archdeacon Nonnus of Nisibis with a letter defending his doctrine. Another story has Abu Raita personally engaging in a debate with Abu Qurra and the East Syriac metropolitan Abdishu ibn Bahriz.

It is possible that his name appears as "Ibn Rabita" in a list of translators of scientific and philosophical works to Arabic provided by Ibn al-Nadim.

He probably died in Tikrit no later than 830 A.D.

== Works ==
Abu Raita's writings are mainly Dialectical aimed at providing answers to questions asked about Christian doctrines. He relies heavily on Christian scriptures and apologetic methods coupled with principles of Hellenistic philosophy. His methods became highly regarded by later Christian apologetics in the Middle East.

Abu Raita's writings show deep knowledge of Islam, as he is able to quote suras alongside Christian scripture references.

=== Bibliography ===
- A Risāla of Abū Rāʾitạ l-Takrītī on the proof of the Christian religion and the proof of the Holy Trinity, On the proof of Christianity and the Trinity (Arabic: رسالة لأبي رائطة التكريتي في إثبات دين النصرانية وإثبات الثالوث المقدس, Risāla li-Abī Rāʾitạ l-Takrītī fī ithbāt dīn al-nasṛ āniyya wa-ithbāt al-Thālūth al-muqaddas), By far the most comprehensive of Ibn Raita's works, it contains responses to potential questions of Muslims regarding the Trinity. It also provides arguments supporting incarnation in a detailed reasoning for God's becoming human as well as some Christian practices such as the eucharist, and fasting.
- The first Risāla : On the Holy Trinity, On the Trinity (الرسالة الأولى لأبي رائطة التكريتي في الثالوث المقدس, Al-risālat al-ūlā fī l-Thālūth al-muqaddas), this is the first of three requested by an unknown fellow Syrian Orthodox. Only the first two survive.
- The second Risāla of Abū Rāʾitạ l-Takrītī: On the Incarnation (الرسالة الثانية لأبي رائطة التكريتي في التجسد, Al-risālat al-thāniya li-Abī Rāʾitạ l-Takrītī fī l-tajassud)
- Unknown risāla in a set of three rasāʾil on the Holy Trinity and the Incarnation, this entry appears in a Coptic list of works of theologians.
- Witnesses from the words of the Torah, the prophets and the saints (شهادات من قول التوراة والأنبياء والقديسين, Shahādāt min qawl al-Tawrāt wa-l-anbiyāʾ wa-l-qiddīsīn), its text contains short quotations from the Hebrew Bible which he uses to proof the doctrine of Trinity.
- From the teaching of Abū Rāʾitạ l-Takrītī, the Syrian, Bishop of Nisibis, by which he demonstrates the authenticity of the Christianity received from the Evangelists who called to it by the Holy Gospel, The authenticity of Christianity (من قول أبي رائطة التكريتي السرياني أسقف نصيبين مستدلا به على صحة النصرانية المقبولة من لدائن المبشرين بها بالإنجيل المقدس, Min qawl Abī Rāʾitạ l-Takrītī al-Suryānī usquf Nasībīn mustadillan bihi ʿalā sị ḥḥat al-Nasṛ āniyya l-maqbūla min al-dāʿīn al-mubashshirīn bihā bi-l-Injīl al-muqaddas), shortest of all of Abu Raita's works. Unlike his other works he offers reasoning for Christianity based on its universal acceptance without resorting to scriptures.
- Letter to the Christians of Baḥrīn (رسالة له لمن بالبحرين من نصارى المغرب, Risāla lahu ilā man bi-l-Baḥrīn min Naṣāra l-maghrib), this letter is mentioned at the end of his second letter on incarnation. Only two brief quotations of this letter have been preserved.
