= Chronicle of Pseudo-Joshua the Stylite =

The Chronicle of Pseudo-Joshua the Stylite is an anonymous Syriac history of the period 494–506 AD. Its actual title as given in the manuscript is A Historical Narrative of the Period of Distress Which Occurred in Edessa, Amid and All Mesopotamia. It is divided between two distressful events that occurred in Edessa and the surrounding region: an outbreak of plague, locusts and famine from 494 to 502 and the Roman–Persian war of 502–506. It is the earliest surviving work of Syriac historiography and provides the most detailed account of the Roman–Persian war. It was written near in time to the events it describes and is thus of the highest historical value.

== Bibliography ==
- Harrak, Amir, ed. (1999). The Chronicle of Zuqnīn, Parts III and IV: A.D. 488–775. Pontifical Institute of Mediaeval Studies.
- Palmer, Andrew (1993). The Seventh Century in the West-Syrian Chronicles. Liverpool University Press.
- Watt, J. W.; Trombley, Frank R., eds. (2000). The Chronicle of Pseudo-Joshua the Stylite. Liverpool University Press. ISBN 9780853235859.
- Watt, John W. (2018) [2011]. "Yeshuʿ the Stylite". In Sebastian P. Brock; Aaron M. Butts; George A. Kiraz; Lucas Van Rompay (eds.). Gorgias Encyclopedic Dictionary of the Syriac Heritage: Electronic Edition. Gorgias Press [online ed. Beth Mardutho].
- Witakowski, Witold, ed. (1996). Pseudo-Dionysius of Tel-Mahre: Chronicle (known also as the Chronicle of Zuqnin), Part III. Liverpool University Press.
