= Zuptara =

Former Syriac Orthodox diocese in Turkey

Zuptara (or Zupatra, Zubtara, Zupatra, Zipatra) was a Syriac Orthodox diocese in the Melitene region of eastern Turkey. The diocese of Zuptara is attested between the eighth and eleventh centuries, and twelve of its bishops are mentioned in the lists of Michael the Syrian. The diocese almost certainly lapsed during the twelfth century.

== Sources ==
The main primary source for the Syriac Orthodox bishops of Zuptara is the record of episcopal consecrations appended to Volume III of the Chronicle of the Syriac Orthodox patriarch Michael the Syrian (1166–99). In this Appendix Michael listed most of the bishops consecrated by the Syriac Orthodox patriarchs of Antioch between the ninth and twelfth centuries. Twenty-eight Syriac patriarchs sat during this period, and in many cases Michael was able to list the names of the bishops consecrated during their reigns, their monasteries of origin, and the place where they were consecrated.

== Location ==
Zuptara was a small town to the southwest of Melitene (modern Malatya) in eastern Turkey. It lay close to the border between the Byzantine Empire and the ʿAbbasid Caliphate, and for much of the ninth and tenth centuries it was disputed between the Byzantines and the Muslims.

== Bishops of Zuptara ==
Twelve Syriac Orthodox bishops of Zuptara between the eighth and eleventh centuries are mentioned in the lists of Michael the Syrian.

| Name | From | Consecrated in the reign of | Place of consecration |
|---|---|---|---|
| Theophilus | Monastery of Elishaʿ | Quriaqos (793–817) | not known |
| Thomas | Monastery of the Easterners | Dionysius I of Tel Mahre (818–45) | not known |
| Shemʿon | Monastery of Mar Yaʿqob of Kaishum | Ignatius II (878–83) | not known |
| Yohannan | Monastery of Mar Shemʿon | Dionysius II (896–909) | not known |
| Theophilus | Monastery of Yohannan | Dionysius II (896–909) | not known |
| David | Monastery of Mar Shlemun of Dolikh | Yohannan IV (910–22) | not known |
| Theodosius | Monastery of Mar Atonos | Yohannan V (936–53) | not known |
| Stephen | not known | Yohannan V (936–53) | not known |
| Basil | not known | Iwanis II (954–7) | not known |
| Yohannan | Monastery of Nahra d'Qarire | Dionysius III (958–61) | not known |
| Quriaqos | Monastery of Nahra d'Qarire | Yohannan VI Sarigta (965–86) | Melitene |
| Yohannan | not known | Yohannan bar ʿAbdon (1042–57) | not known |

The diocese of Zuptara almost certainly lapsed during the twelfth century.
