= Irenopolis (Cilicia) =

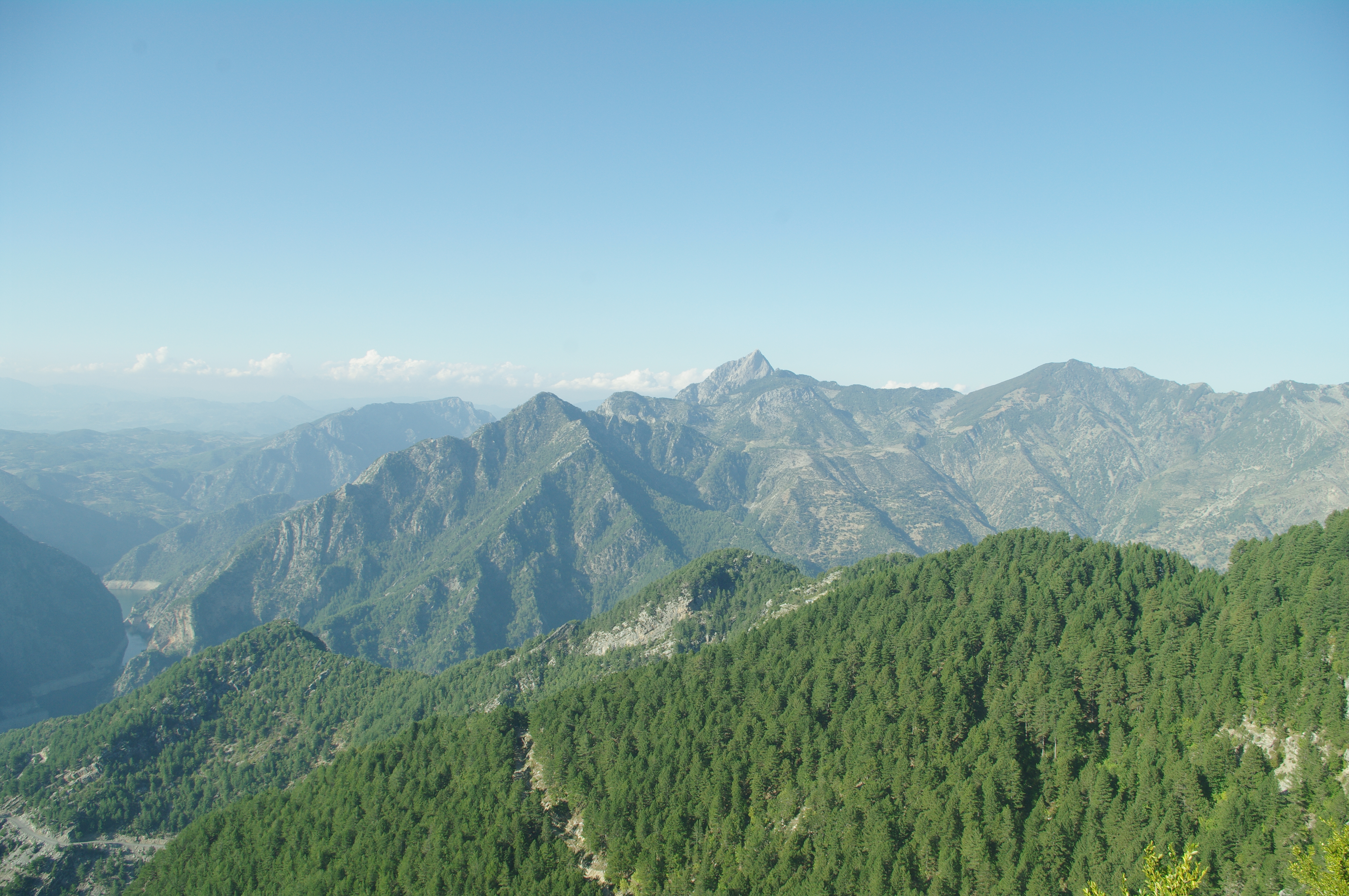
- Landscape near Irenopolis

- Location within Turkey
- Coordinates: 37°14′35″N 36°27′24″E

Irenopolis or Eirenopolis or Eirenoupolis (Greek: Εἰρηνούπολις) was an ancient Roman, Byzantine and medieval city in northeastern Cilicia, not far from the Calycadnus river, also known briefly as Neronias (Greek: Νερωνιάς) in honour of the Roman emperor Nero. Irenopolis was also an episcopal see that is now included in the Catholic Church's list of titular sees.

== Location ==
It is located on the site of Düziçi (formerly Haruniye) in the province of Osmaniye. Located at the mouth of the Darb al-‛Ain pass, which led from al-Hārūnīya to Germanikeia, 104 km SE of Adana and 29.5 km NE of Osmaniye.E. Honigmann's identification of Irenopolis with Bagdacik, the "little Irenopolis" (in contrast to the "great Irenopolis"), 25 km NE of Osmaniye on the way to Hasanbeyli, is wrong because the area is called Buğdaycik. The site is a little higher than Hierapolis Kastabala and Anazarbus, on the mountain preventing access to the Cilician plain from the east.

== History ==
It was probably founded by Antiochus IV of Commagene. The coins of the city show that Asclepius and Hygeia were worshiped in the city during pagan era. The cult of the two gods in the city may be connected with the natural spring of the area.

Theodoret of Cyrus confirms that the two names, Eirenopolis and Neronias, apparently refer to the same city. The name Neronias refereeing to honors bestowed on the city by Nero. The city is mentioned by Hierocles Nicephore and Calliste. The city came under Muslim rule following the Battle of Manzikert in 1071.

== Bishopric ==
Christianity first came to the area in the 1st century the strategic location through the mountain passes, and the work of St Paul made it an early candidate for missionaries. The city was the seat of a bishopric in Byzantine times.

Known residential bishops

- The Bishop Narcissus participated in the councils of Ankara and Neocaesarea in 314 AD and Nicaea in 325 AD the Council of Antioch as sometime claimed.
- Indimus
- Basilius
- John Bishop of Irenapolis, Cilicia
- Procopius
- Paul.

Titular Catholic bishops

- Stefano Missir (1837–1863)
- Luigi Ciurcia (1866–1881)
- Luigi Matera (1882–1891)
- Anatol Wincenty Nowak (Novak) (1900–1924)
- Alfred-Jules Mélisson (1925)
- Alexandre-Philibert Poirier (1925–1927)
- Antoni Wladyslaw Szlagowski (1928–1945)
- Allen James Babcock (15 Feb 1947 – 1954)
- Oscar de Oliveira (1954–1959)
- Georges Jacquot (20 May 1959 – 1961)
- Gaetano Michetti (1961–1975)

== Coinage ==
The city minted its own coinage, from 92/93 AD, during Domitian's reign, were still minted until the reign of Gallienus (253–268 AD).

== Archaeology ==
An archaeological excavation uncovered five charred loaves of bread from the 7th-8th centuries AD, including one with a rare depiction of "Farming Jesus" and a Greek inscription "To Blessed Jesus, with our gratitude".

== See also ==
- Castabala
- Kırmıtlı
- Osmaniye Province

== Sources ==
- Panagopoulou, Katerina. "Eirenopolis". Encyclopedia of the Hellenic World, Asia Minor. Foundation of the Hellenic World.
