= Calliste =

Calliste can refer to the following entries:

- Calliste (mythology), a character in Greek mythology
- Jason Calliste (born 1990), Canadian basketball player
- Jerry Calliste Jr. (born 1965), American entrepreneur, music industry executive producer, songwriter, record producer, music publisher, and former DJ
