= List of bishops of Edessa =

Below is a list of bishops of Edessa.

== Early bishops ==
The following list is based on the records of the Chronicle of Edessa (to c.540) and the Chronicle of Zuqnin.

Name of bishop	Start date or floruit	End date or death	Notes
Thaddeus (Addai I)	c.100		According to Eusebius of Caesarea
Aggai	c.190		According to Eusebius
Palut	c.200		According to Eusebius; He was a contemporary of Serapion of Antioch
Barsamya	c. 250		
Conon	304		
Sha'ad (Saades)			The Chronicle of Edessa places him between Conon and Ethalaha
Aitalaha	324		The Chronicle of Edessa omits his date of death; Abraham became bishop in 346
Abraham (I)	346	361	
Barses	361	March 378	Translated by imperial order from Harran to Edessa
Eulogius	379	Good Friday 387	Said to have been ordained the same year Theodosius I became emperor
Cyrus I		22 July 396	
Silvanus	397	17 October 398	
Pakida (Facidas)	23 November 398	"neomenia of the month of Ab" 409	
Diogenes	409	411	
Rabbula	411	8 August 435	
Ibas	435	1 January 448	The Chronicle of Edessa states he was deposed 1 January 448 and restored two years later
Nonnus	21 July 448	450	The Chronicle of Edessa states he left the see in 450, but was restored to Edessa after Ibas' death in 457
Ibas (restored)	450	28 October 457	
Nonnus (restored)	457	471	
Cyrus II	471	5 June 498	Cyrus convinced Emperor Zeno to close the School of the Persians in Edessa
Peter	498	10 April 510	Entered Edessa on 12 September
Paul	510	27 July 522	Deposed for monophysitism
Asclepius	23 October 522	27 June 526	Died in Antioch; Paul had appointed him bishop of Harran
Paul (restored)	8 March 526	30 October 526	Accepted the council of Chalcedon and restored after Asclepius' death
Andrew	7 February 527	6 December 532	
Addi (Addai II)	28 August 533	541	Died after the completion of the Chronicle of Edessa
Amazonius	553		
Thomas			
Theodore	c.570	600	Perhaps bishop of Bostra (not Edessa)

== Syriac Orthodox bishops ==
These bishops belonged to the Syriac Orthodox Church. During the later period there were also Byzantine rite bishops alongside them.

Name of bishop	Start date or floruit	End date or death	Notes
Jacob Baradeus (James I)	541	30 July 578	
Severus	578	602/603	Stoned to death by Narses
In the first half of the seventh century, the episcopal structure appears to have been disrupted due to war: 602/603 — Edessa captured by the Persians; recovered by the Romans 604/605; May 611 — Edessa recaptured by the Persians; 627 — Persians evacuate Edessa as part of treaty 638 — Edessa surrenders to the Muslim general Yazid
John	609		
Paul	fl. 624		In exile in Egypt (c.609–619) and Cyprus (619–629)
Isaiah		628	Sent into exile
Simon I (Simeon I)	before 644	649/650	Died in Amida; Possibly an Orthodox bishop
Cyriacus I	650/651	664/665	
Daniel	669		
Jacob II (James II)	664/665	709/710	According to some sources, ruled twice: from c.684 to 688 and again in 708 until his death on 5 June
Habib	709/710	728/729	Some sources place him between the two terms of Jacob II
Gabriel	724		
Constantine I	728/729		Date of death missing from the Chronicle of Zuqnin, which extends his episcopate up to 745
Athanasius			Known only from the Chronicle of 846
Timothy (I) ?	before 755	754/755	
Zacharias the Stylite ?	754/755	760/7671	
Simon II (Simeon II)		761	Retired
Anastasius		761	Retired
Elijah of Qartnim (Elijah I)	760/761	after 775	The Chronicle of Zuqnin says that he was never ordained; Was apparently still bishop when the Chronicle of Zuqnin ends (775)
Basil I			Ruled during the patriarchate of Cyriacus (793–817)
Theodosius I			Ruled during the patriarchate of Cyriacus (793–817)
Cyril			Ruled during the patriarchate of Dionysius I (817–845)
Elijah II			Ruled during the patriarchate of Dionysius I (817–845)
Constantine II			Ruled during the patriarchate of Dionysius I (817–845)
Theodosius II	825		
Cyriacus II			Ruled during the patriarchate of Ignatius II (878–883)
Theodosius III			Ruled during the patriarchate of Dionysius II (897–909)
Dioscorus			Ruled during the patriarchate of Dionysius II (897–909)
Timothy (II)			Ruled during the patriarchate of Dionysius II (897–909)
Philoxenus I			Ruled during the patriarchate of Basil I (923–935)
Abraham (II)			Ruled during the patriarchate of John VI (936–953)
Philoxenus II			Ruled during the patriarchate of John VIII (1004–1033)
Athanasius I (Joshua)			Ruled during the patriarchate of Dionysius IV (1034–1044)
Hayya	before 1034	after 1074	
Athanasius II			Ruled during the patriarchate of Basil II (1074–1075)
Basil II Abu Ghalib bar Sabuni		after December 1101	Deposed
Ignatius Jadida	after December 1101		
Athanasius III	1130		
Basil III bar Shumna	before 1144	after 1166	
Athanasius IV	c.1169		
Basil IV			
Abdallah	1444		Ruled during the patriarchate of Ignatius V (1412–1454); Entered into communion with the Roman church at the Council of Florence (1444)

== Armenian bishops ==
These bishops belonged to the Armenian church. They ruled alongside Syriac Orthodox, Byzantine and Latin bishops.

Name of bishop	Start date	End date or death	Notes
John	before 1144	after 1144	Also called Ananias

== Church of the East bishops ==
These bishops belonged to the Church of the East.

Name of bishop	Start date	End date or death	Notes
Ahischema	609		A Nestorian bishop imposed by the Persian king Khosrau II

== Latin archbishops ==
In the first half of the twelfth century, during the period of the Crusades and the county of Edessa, there was a Latin Church archdiocese based in the city. It seems to have displaced the Byzantine bishop, but ruled alongside the Syriac Orthodox and Armenian bishops. From the 13th century on, titular bishops were sometimes appointed.

=== Resident bishops ===
Name of bishop	Start date	End date or death	Notes
Benedict	December 1099	after 1104	Consecrated in December 1099
Hugh	before 1120	23 December 1144	Killed when Edessa was conquered by the Turks

=== Titular bishops ===
Name of bishop	Start date	End date or death	Notes
William Freney	1266	after 1286	Visited the Armenian kingdom of Cilicia; Possibly resident in Edessa
John	after 1286		
Martin			
John David	30 May 1343		Possibly resident in Edessa
No titular bishops appointed for centuries.
Livio Lilio	18 August 1625	22 June 1643	Died in office
Giacinto di Subiano, O.P.	14 November 1644	13 July 1648	Became archbishop of Smyrna
Johann Eberhard Nidhard, S.J.	16 November 1671	8 August 1672	Became cardinal-priest of San Bartolomeo all'Isola
Carlo Francesco Airoldi	26 June 1673	before 15 April 1683	Died in office
Thomas Vidoni	27 September 1690	29 October 1708	Became a cardinal
Girolamo Grimaldi	5 October 1712	2 October 1730	Became a cardinal
Giovanni Battista Barni	22 January 1731	9 September 1743	Became a cardinal
Antonio Milón López	5 April 1745	4 June 1762	Died in office
Manuel Ferrer y Figueredo	27 March 1765	23 June 1777	Became bishop of Zamora
Gregorio Bandi	17 December 1787	10 April 1802	Died in office
Francesco Bertazzoli	24 May 1802	16 May 1823	Became cardinal-priest of Santa Maria sopra Minerva
Giacinto Placido Zurla, O.S.B.	13 January 1824	29 October 1834	Died in office
Ignazio Giovanni Cadolini	12 February 1838	30 January 1843	Became archbishop of Ferrara
Patrick Joseph Carew	30 May 1843	2 November 1855	Died in office
Vincenzo Massoni	19 June 1856	3 June 1857	Died in office
Gustav Adolf von Hohenlohe-Schillingsfürst	13 November 1857	25 June 1866	Became cardinal-priest of Santa Maria in Traspontina
Giuseppe Cardoni	22 February 1867	8 April 1873	Died in office
Tommaso Michele Salzano, O.P.	22 December 1873	12 September 1890	Died in office
Filippo Castracane degli Antelminelli	25 September 1891	21 August 1899	Died in office
Gennaro Granito Pignatelli di Belmonte	17 November 1899	30 November 1911	Became cardinal-priest of Santa Maria degli Angeli e dei Martiri
Tommaso Pio Boggiani, O.P.	10 January 1912	4 December 1916	Became cardinal-priest of Santi Quirico e Giulitta
Giovanni Battista Marenco, S.D.B.	7 January 1917	22 October 1921	Died in office
Mario Giardini, B.	21 November 1921	16 May 1931	Became archbishop of Ancona
Luigi Centoz	28 January 1932	28 October 1969	Died in office
