= Hadath (West Syriac diocese) =

Syriac Orthodox Church diocese in Turkey

Hadath (or Hadeth, Syriac: ܚܕܬ) was a diocese of the Syriac Orthodox Church in the Malatya region of what is now Turkey, attested between the eighth and eleventh centuries. It was based in the town of Hadath.

== Location ==
Hadath was a small town near Melitene (modern Malatya), now in ruins, close to the village of Saray Koy in the vilayet of Gaziantep, in Turkey. According to the Chronicle of Michael the Syrian, the town was founded in AG 1095 [AD 783/4], towards the end of the reign of the Abbasid caliph al-Mahdi (774–85), by ʿAli ibn Sulaiman, the son of the Arab governor of Mesopotamia. It was evidently given a Syriac Orthodox bishop very shortly after its foundation.

== Bishops of Hadath ==
The main source for the bishops of Hadath is the record of episcopal consecrations appended to Volume III of the Chronicle of Syriac Orthodox Patriarch Michael the Syrian (1166–99). In this Appendix Michael lists nearly all of the bishops consecrated by the Syriac Orthodox Patriarchs between the ninth and twelfth centuries. Twenty-eight Patriarchs sat during this period, and in most cases Michael was able to list the names of the bishops consecrated during their reigns, their monasteries of origin, and the place where they were consecrated. In these lists, Michael mentions fourteen Bishops of Hadath serving between the eighth and eleventh centuries.

Name	From	Consecrated in the reign of	Place of consecration	Title
Eliya	not known	Quriaqos (793–817)	Monastery of the Column, Callinicus	Hadath
Giwargis	Monastery of Gubba Barraya, Edessa	Dionysius I of Tel Mahre (818–45)	not known	Hadath
Ignatius	Monastery of Mar Zakkai, Callinicus	Yohannan III (847–74)	not known	Hadath
Eliya	Monastery of Mar Severus	Ignatius II (878–83)	not known	Hadath
Cosmas	not known	Dionysius II (896–909)	not known	Hadath
Giwargis	Mountain of Edessa	Dionysius II (896–909)	not known	Hadath
Shemʿon	Monastery of Mar Yaʿqob of Kaishum	Basil (923–35)	not known	Hadath
Gregory	Monastery of Mar Yohannan	Basil (923–35)	not known	Hadath
Abraham	Monastery of Mar Zakkai, Callinicus	Yohannan V (936–53)	not known	Hadath
Dionysius	not known	Yohannan VI Sarigta (965–86)	not known	Hadath
Iwanis	Monastery of Mar Laʿzar of ʿArqa	Yohannan VII bar ʿAbdon (1004–30)	not known	Hadath and Raʿban
Basil	Monastery of Mar Ahron, Shigar	Dionysius IV (1032–42)	not known	Hadath
Iwanis	patriarchal cell	Yohannan bar ʿAbdon (1042–57)	not known	Hadath
Timothy	Monastery of Bar Gaghi, Melitene	Yohannan bar ʿAbdon (1042–57)	Hani, Tur ʿAbdin	Hadath

Further details of some of these bishops are supplied in the narrative sections of the Chronicle of Michael the Syrian and in the Chronicon Ecclesiasticum of Bar Hebraeus:

- Iwanis (1004/1030) was taken to Constantinople in 1029 with the patriarch Yohannan VII bar ʿAbdon on the orders of the Byzantine emperor Romanus III Argyrus, and was imprisoned in an attempt to force him to make a Chalcedonian confession of faith. He died in prison.
