= Stephen bar Sudayli =

5th century Syrian mystic

Stephen bar Sudayli (fl. 500) was a Syrian Christian mystical writer established in Jerusalem who flourished about the end of the 5th century AD.

The earlier part of his career was passed at Edessa, of which he may have been a native. He afterwards removed to Jerusalem, where he lived as a monk and endeavoured to make converts to his doctrines, both by teaching among the community there and by letters to his former friends at Edessa.

Bar Sudayli was the author of commentaries on the Bible and other theological works. His fame as a writer, however, rests primarily on his identification with the author of a treatise which survives in a single Syriac manuscript (British Library Add MS 7189, written mainly in the 13th century), The book of Hierotheus on the hidden mysteries of the house of God. The work claims to be by Hierotheos (said to be a teacher of Pseudo-Dionysius the Areopagite) and had some popularity within the Syrian Orthodox Church. The book states a pantheistic interpretation of God.

Two of his contemporaries Jacob of Serugh (451–521) and Philoxenus of Mabbogh (d. 523), wrote letters in condemnation of his teaching. They attacked two of Bar Sudayli’s main theses: (1) the limited duration of the future punishment of sinners, and (2) the pantheistic doctrine that all nature is consubstantial with the Divine essence, that the whole universe has emanated from God, and will in the end return to and be absorbed in him. In particular, Philoxenus’s attack led to Bar Sudayli being regarded as a heretic by all Monophysites.
