= Pons of Melgueil =

French abbot

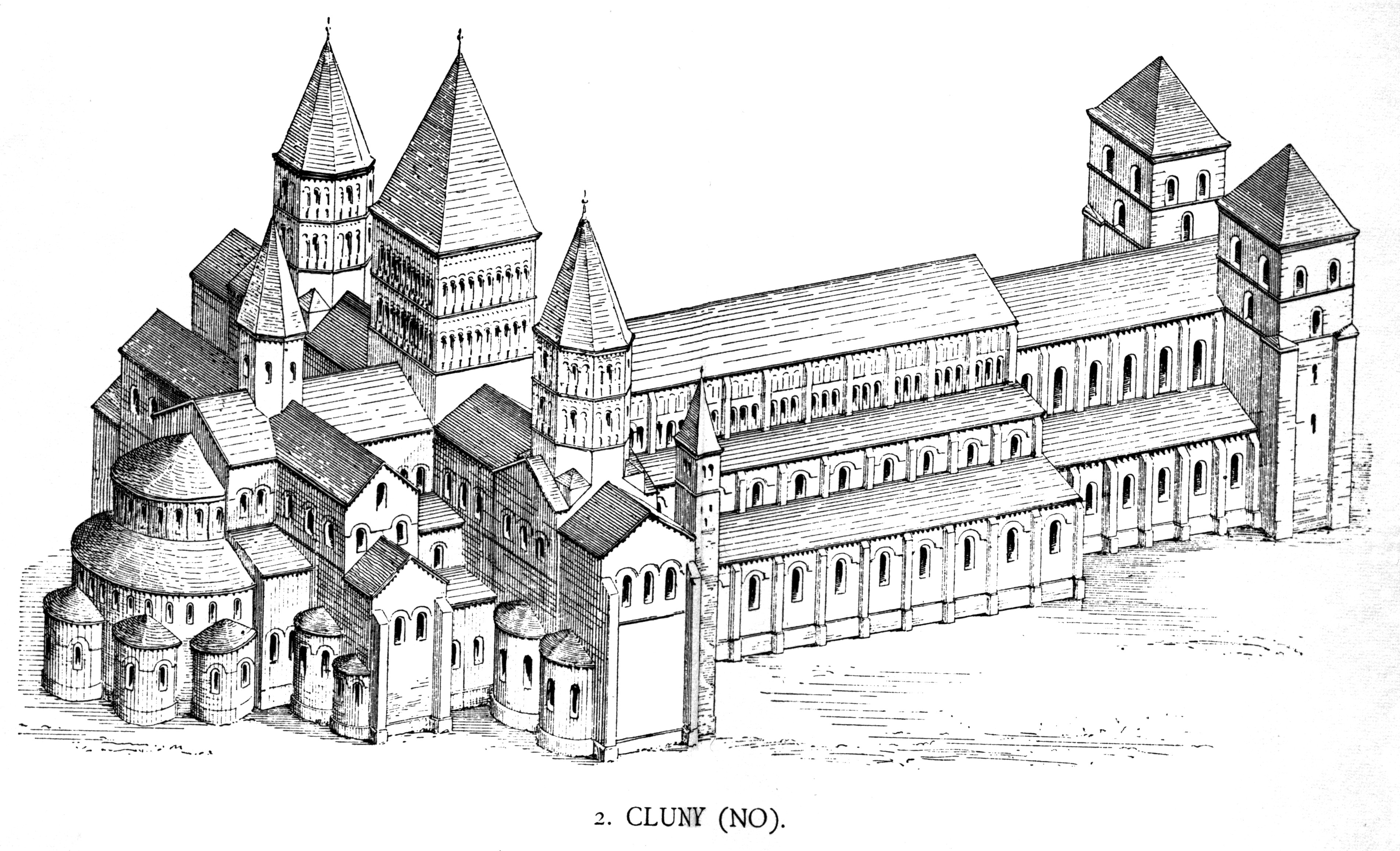
Cluny III as it looked upon completion, a major preoccupation of Pons' abbacy

Pons of Melgueil (c. 1075 – 1126) was the seventh Abbot of Cluny from 1109 to 1122.

Pons was the second child of Peter I of Melgueil and Almodis of Toulouse. He was descended from a noble lineage of Languedoc which had long supported the Gregorian reform. He himself was a nephew and godson of Pope Paschal II. He was an oblate at the abbey of Saint-Pons-de-Thomières, before pronouncing his vows with the Benedictines at Cluny.

Pons was elected to succeed Hugh of Semur after the latter's death. For most of his abbacy he continued Hugh's policies: the construction of the third great abbey church of Cluny ("Cluny III"), expansion of the Cluniac order into northern France and England, and mediating the Investiture Controversy between Emperor and Pope.

In 1118 the Holy Roman Emperor, Henry V, still contesting the Investiture Controversy, marched on Rome and Pope Gelasius II fled to Cluny. Before his death in 1119, Gelasius indicated that either Archbishop Guy of Vienne, or Pons of Cluny be chosen to succeed him. Guy was elected and took the name Callixtus II. Relations were strained between Rome and Cluny for a time. In 1119 Pons' government was publicly protested by Bérard de Châtillon, the Bishop of Mâcon, and Humbaud, the Archbishop of Lyon.

In the consistory of January 1120 Pope Calixtus II named Pons a cardinal-deacon. He also canonized Pons' predecessor and raised the Diocese of Santiago de Compostela to metropolitan status for the benefit of Pons' friend, Diego Gelmírez.

In 1122, on a pretext of extravagance, Pons' own monks challenged his leadership. Pope Callistus II summoned him to Rome to attend the First Ecumenical Lateran Council and the abbot resigned his post. He then went to Jerusalem and a year later, returned to Italy and founded a small monastery near Vicenza. In 1123 he was one of the participants in the Diet of Worms.

Pons tried to regain his position in 1125 but was arrested. He died in prison. Historians have generally rejected the official rationale for Pons' removal. Pietro Zerbi argued that he was the victim of opposition from the bishops disadvantaged by the many privileges his order received under his and Hugh's management. Adriaan Bredero believed he was brought down by a faction of reform-minded monks who desired to bring Cluny closer to the ideal of Cîteaux. Financial difficulties had also appeared for Cluny during Pons' abbacy, after Alfonso VI of León defaulted on his pledged annual donations (the so-called "Alfonsine census") in 1111. They did not resume, as the source of the monies, the parias León had been collecting, had dried up c. 1100.

== Notes ==
Catholic Church titles
| Preceded by Hugh the Great | Abbot of Cluny; 1109–1122 | Succeeded by Hugh II of Cluny |
| Preceded by Hugh II of Cluny | Abbot of Cluny; 1126 | Succeeded by Peter the Venerable |
