= Theodore Abu Qurrah =

9th-century Melkite bishop and theologian

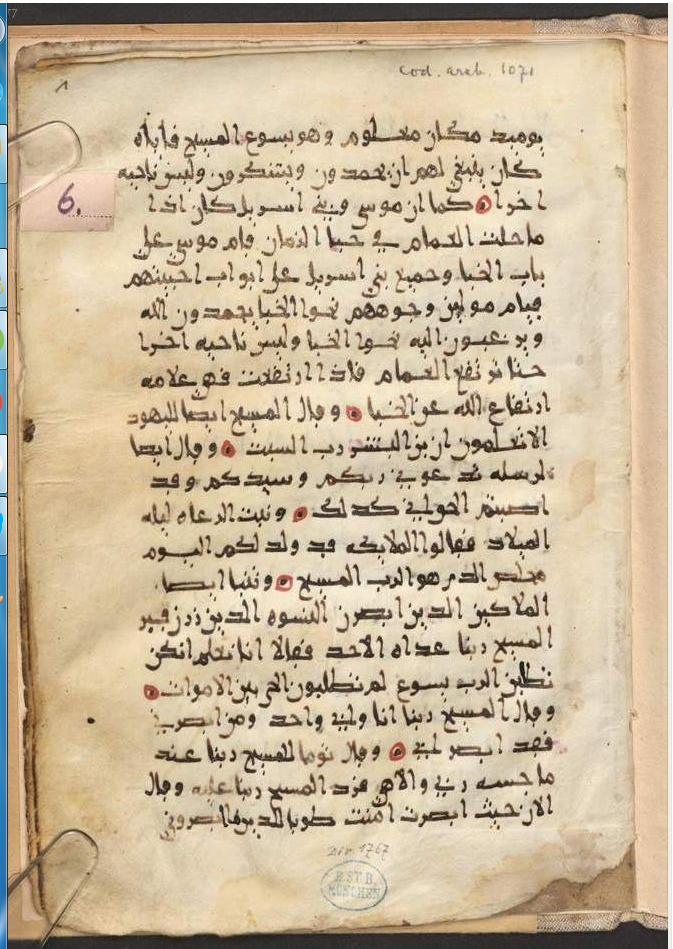
Manuscript copy of an apologetic work of Theodore Abū Qurrah.

Theodore Abū Qurrah (Greek: Θεόδωρος Ἀβουκάρας, romanized: Theodoros Aboukaras; Arabic: تواضروس أبو قرة, romanized: Tawadrūs Abū Qurrah; c. 750 – c. 825) was a 9th-century Melkite bishop and theologian who lived in the early Islamic period.

== Biography ==
Theodore was born around 750 in the city of Edessa (Şanlıurfa), in northern Mesopotamia (Urfa, Turkey), and was the Chalcedonian Bishop of the nearby city of Harran until some point during the archbishopric of Theodoret of Antioch (795–812). Michael the Syrian, who disapproved of Theodore, later claimed that the archbishop had deposed Theodore for heresy, although this is unlikely. While it has been suggested that Theodore was a monk at the monastery of Mar Saba, there is little evidence for that. It is known for certain, however, that between 813 and 817 he debated with the Monophysites of Armenia at the court of Ashot Msakeri.

Around 814, Theodore visited Alexandria. On his way, he sojourned at Sinai where, for one Abū 'l-Tufayl, he wrote the Book of Master and Disciple (now ascribed to "Thaddeus of Edessa"). The final historical record to his life is the Arabic translation of pseudo-Aristotle's De virtutibus animae, most likely around 816. He died probably between 820 and 825.

== Writings ==
Abū Qurrah was among the earliest Christian authors to use Arabic alongside Abu-Ra'itah of Tikrit, Ammar al-Basri and Abdulmasih al-Kindi. His works were referenced and reused by other Arab Christian writers such as the eleventh century bishop Sulayman al-Ghazzi. Some of his works were translated into Greek, and so circulated in Byzantium. He wrote thirty treatises in Syriac, but none of these have yet been identified. His writings provide an important witness to Christian thought in the early Islamic world. A number of them were edited with German translations by Georg Graf and have now been translated into English by John C. Lamoreaux.

Abū Qurrah argued for the rightness of his faith against the habitual challenges of Islam, Judaism and those Christians who did not accept the doctrinal formulations of the Council of Chalcedon, and in doing so rearticulated traditional Christian teachings at times using the language and concepts of Islamic theologians: he has been described by Sidney H. Griffith as a Christian mutakallim. He attracted the attention of at least one Muslim Mu'tazilite mutakallim, Isa ibn Sabih al-Murdar (died 840), who is recorded (by the biobibliographical writer, Ibn al-Nadim, who died in 995) as having written a refutation of Abū Qurrah. The subjects covered were, in the main, the doctrine of the Trinity, the Incarnation, and the Sacraments, as well as the practices of facing east in prayer (rather than towards Jerusalem or Mecca), and the veneration of the cross and other images.

In Abū Qurrah's Questions of Priest Musa, in the course of its first two discourses ("On the Existence of God and the True Religion") he used a thought experiment in which he imagined himself having grown up away from civilization (on a mountain) and descending to 'the cities' to inquire after the truth of religion: an attempt to provide a philosophical argument in support of Chalcedonian Christianity from first principles.

Theodore also translated the pseudo-Aristotelian De virtutibus animae into Arabic from Greek for Tahir ibn Husayn at some point, perhaps around 816.

== Published works ==
- Some works in J.-P. Migne, Patrologia graeca, 97
- I. Arendzen, Theodori Abu Kurra De cultu imaginum libellus e codice arabico (Bonn, 1897)
- C. Bacha, Les oeuvres arabes de Théodore Aboucara (Beyrout, 1904)
- C. Bacha, Un traité des oeuvres arabes de Théodore Abou-Kurra (Tripoli [Syria] – Rome, 1905)
- G. Graf, Die arabischen Schriften des Theodor Abu Qurra, Bischofs von Harran (c. 740–820), in Forschungen zur christlichen Literatur- und Dogmengeschichte, X Band, 3/4 Heft (Paderborn, 1910)
- L. Cheikho, 'Mimar li Tadurus Abi Qurrah fi Wugud al-Haliq wa d-Din al-Qawim', al-Machriq, 15 (1912), pp. 757–74, 825–842
- G. Graf, Des Theodor Abu Kurra Traktat uber den Schopfer und die wahre Religion (Munster, 1913)
- I. Dick, 'Deux écrits inédits de Théodore Abuqurra', Le Muséon, 72 (1959), pp. 53–67
- S. H. Griffith, 'Some Unpublished Arabic Sayings Attributed to Theodore Abu Qurrah', Le Muséon, 92 (1979), pp. 29–35
- I. Dick, Théodore Abuqurra. Traité de l'existence du Créateur et de la vraie religion / Maymar fi wujud al-Kaliq qa-l-din al-qawim li-Thawudhurus Abi Qurra (Jounieh, 1982)
- S. K. Samir, 'Kitab "Jami' wujuh al-iman" wa-mujadalat Abi Qurra 'an salb al-Masih', Al-masarra, 70 )1984), 411–27
- I. Dick, Théodore Abuqurra. Traité du culte des icônes / Maymar fi ikram al-ayqunat li-Thawudhurus Abi Qurra (Jounieh, 1986)
- S. H. Griffith, 'Theodore Abû Qurrah's Arabic tract on the Christian practice of venerating images', Journal of the American Oriental Society, 105 (1985)
- R. Glei and A. Khoury, Johannaes Damaskenos und Theodor Abu Qurra. Schriften zum Islam (Wurzburg, 1995), pp. 86–127, 148–49, 150–53
- Teodoro Abū Qurrah, La difesa delle icone. Trattato sulla venerazione delle immagini, introduzione, traduzione, note ed indici a cura di Paola Pizzo (1995), 192p. ISBN 9788816403840
- Yuliyan Velikov, The Word about the Image. Theodore Abū Qurrah and St Cyril the Philosopher and the Defence of the Holy Icons in the Ninth Century, Veliko Turnovo University Press (2009) (in Bulgarian)
- David Bertaina, "An Arabic account of Theodore Abu Qurra in debate at the court of Caliph al-Ma'mun: A study in early Christian and Muslim literary dialogues", Ph.D. diss., Catholic University of America, 2007.
- John C. Lamoreaux, Theodore Abu Qurrah. "English translation of nearly the complete corpus of Theodore Abu Qurrah’s works, with extensive notes on the Arabic and Greek texts.", Brigham Young University, 2006. ISBN 978-0934893008

== Works available online ==
=== Arabic ===
- C. Bacha, Un Traité des oeuvres arabes de Théodore Abou-Kurra

=== Greek ===
- Greek works with Latin Translation, from Migne, Patrologia graeca, vol. 97 (and 94) (Paris, 1865)

=== Translations ===
- English: Debate of Theodore Abu Qurra at the court of al-Ma'mun (Arabic text and English translation) par David Bertaina, 2007
- German: G. Graf, Die arabischen Schriften des Theodor Abû Qurra
- French: A treatise on the veneration of images and Demonstration of the Faith of the Church through the two Testaments and the Councils
- Russian: G. Sablukov, Translation of 15 Theodore Abu Qurrah's Greek Works about islam, Missioner 6 (1879), and Dialogue with a Muslim
