= Quriaqos of Tagrit =

53rd Patriarch of Syriac Orthodox Church of Antioch (793-817)

- Syriac Orthodox Patriarch of Antioch and All the East
- Church: Syriac Orthodox Church
- See: Antioch
- Installed: 793
- Term ended: 817
- Predecessor: Joseph
- Successor: Dionysius I Telmaharoyo

Personal details
- Born: Tagrit, Abbasid Caliphate
- Died: June/16 August 817 Mosul, Abbasid Caliphate

Sainthood
- Feast day: 13 August/16 August
- Venerated in: Syriac Orthodox Church

Quriaqos of Tagrit (Syriac: ܩܘܪܝܐܩܘܣ, Arabic: قرياقس بطريرك انطاكية) was the Patriarch of Antioch, and head of the Syriac Orthodox Church, from 793 until his death in 817. He is commemorated as a saint by the Syriac Orthodox Church in the Martyrology of Rabban Sliba, and his feast day is 13 or 16 August.

== Biography ==
Quriaqos was born and raised at Tagrit in the 8th century, and became a monk at the Monastery of the Pillar near Raqqa, where he studied theology. He was elected as patriarch of Antioch, and ordained at Harran on 17 August 793. Soon after his ascension to the patriarchate, Quriaqos had to resolve the issue of Zachariah, the former Bishop of Edessa, who had been deposed by Patriarch George I of Antioch in 785/786 due to complaints from the city's clergymen and chief laymen, and had unsuccessfully petitioned Quriaqos' predecessor Joseph to restore him to his former see. Quriaqos travelled with Zachariah to the city, and it was agreed that he would receive four rural districts in the diocese on the condition that they revert to the city's bishop on his death, and he ordained a monk of Qenneshre named Basil as bishop of Edessa. In the same year as his ascension to the patriarchate in 793, Quriaqos travelled to Tagrit in response to an appeal to resolve a dispute between the archbishop of Tagrit and the monks of the Monastery of Saint Matthew. The patriarch declared that the archbishop of Tagrit had the authority to ordain an archbishop for the monastery, Nineveh, and some churches of Mosul.

Quriaqos aimed to put to an end to the phrase, 'we break the heavenly bread in the name of the Father and of the Son and of the Holy Ghost' in celebrating the Eucharist, which the Patriarch George had declared heretical as he argued it implied a division of the person of Christ, but its usage had not been banned in fear of a schism as it was popular at the monasteries of Gubo Baroyo and Qartmin. Priests ordained by Quriaqos were forbidden from using the phrase. This drew the ire of the proponents of the phrase, and at the synod of Beth Batin in November 794/795, it was decided that the phrase was permissible, to Quriaqos' chagrin. The patriarch's opponents further disrupted his policies in his attempt to reconcile with the Julianists, a fellow non-Chalcedonian sect. Quriaqos held a synod at the Monastery of Nawawis in 797/798, and on 7 September, a union with the Julianists was agreed after a creed co-written by Quriaqos and the Julianist patriarch Gabriel was accepted. It was stipulated that Gabriel would become the next patriarch of Antioch if Quriaqos predeceased him. However, the agreement did not come to fruition as Quriaqos' opponents refused to accept the union, and accused him of becoming a Julianist.

Quriaqos had some success in confronting his opponents, in that Severus of Samosata was successfully dealt with after the patriarch appealed to the Muslim authorities. His success was short-lived as Quriaqos' deposition of Bishop Bacchus of Cyrrhus prompted an open schism. Bacchus was deposed after several warnings, but he defied the patriarch, encouraged the use of the aforementioned 'heavenly bread' phrase amongst clergymen in his diocese, and demanded that all future bishops of Cyrrhus have first been a monk at the Monastery of Gubo Baroyo, where he resided. Quriaqos disregarded Bacchus' demand, and ordained Solomon, a monk of the Monastery of Jacob of Cyrrhus, as bishop, but this incensed his opponents, and Quriaqos was removed from the diptychs of the diocese of Cyrrhus. The dispute escalated in 807 as monks from the Monastery of Gubo Baroyo met with the Caliph Harun al-Rashid, and accused Quriaqos of being an eastern Roman sympathiser and spy, and of constructing churches on the frontier with the eastern Roman Empire so to further aid them in the conflict against the caliphate. All churches on the frontier were thus destroyed on the caliph's orders, as well as churches at Antioch and Jerusalem. The patriarch survived the incident unscathed as Harun's secretary Isma'il ibn Salih, who was acquainted with and on good terms with Quriaqos, was charged with handling the accusations, and exiled the monks.

To reassert his authority on the church, Quriaqos summoned a synod at Beth Gabrin near Cyrrhus in 807/808, and excommunicated and deposed his opponents. After the synod, a monk of Qartmin named Abraham, who was resentful towards Quriaqos for refusing to pardon his brother Simeon, a monk of Gubo Baroyo, joined the schismatics and was subsequently proclaimed patriarch by the monks of Gubo Baroyo. Abraham consecrated his own bishops, accused Quriaqos of being a Julianist, and promoted the 'heavenly bread' phrase, to which the patriarch responded by excommunicating him and his supporters. Abraham unsuccessfully appealed to the Coptic Pope Mark II of Alexandria for recognition, but was met with excommunication after the pope received a letter from Quriaqos. The schism with Abraham and his supporters went unresolved for the remainder of Quriaqos' reign.

He summoned another synod at Harran in 812/813. In c. 816, in response to an invitation from Prince Ashot Msaker to debate the Chalcedonian Theodore Abu Qurrah, Quriaqos sent Nonnus of Nisibis to represent the non-Chalcedonians. A dispute between the Archbishop Basil I of Tagrit and the Monastery of Saint Matthew erupted in 817 as Basil opposed the monks' election of a certain Daniel as archbishop, and Quriaqos was forced to intervene as the situation deteriorated. Quriaqos supported Basil I as the archbishop had precedence over all other bishops in the former Sassanian Empire, and excommunicated the monks. The patriarch convened a synod at Mosul to resolve the issue, and acknowledged Daniel as archbishop of the Monastery of Saint Matthew, on the condition that he accepted his subordination to the archbishop of Tagrit. Although the precedence of the archbishop of Tagrit was established at the synod, his power was limited, whereby it was decreed he must not act in a suffragan diocese without its bishop's consent, nor ordain a bishop without the approval of the archbishop of the Monastery of Saint Matthew, and thus the dispute was resolved. Quriaqos died soon after at Mosul in June or August 817, and was buried at Tagrit. As patriarch, he consecrated eighty-six bishops.

== Works ==
Quriaqos issued forty-six canons at the synod of Beth Batin in 794/795, one of which ordered clergymen and laymen to not enter the churches of the Nestorians, Chalcedonians, and Julianists, and to not participate in their services. The canons also forbade the baptism of adherents of the aforementioned churches, and condemned clergymen who were involved in divination. As well as this, he enacted twenty-six canons at the synod of Harran in 812/813.

The patriarch also wrote a biography of Patriarch Severus of Antioch, an anaphora, and ten letters in response to questions from Yeshu, deacon of Tirminaz. Additionally, he is credited with writing a book on theological teaching, divided into three volumes and 98 treatises.

== Bibliography ==
- Barsoum, Ephrem (2003). The Scattered Pearls: A History of Syriac Literature and Sciences. Translated by Matti Moosa (2nd ed.). Gorgias Press.
- Ignatius Jacob III (2008). History of the Monastery of Saint Matthew in Mosul. Translated by Matti Moosa. Gorgias Press.
- Fiey, Jean Maurice (2004). Lawrence Conrad (ed.). Saints Syriaques (in French). The Darwin Press.
- Keating, Sandra Toenies (2003). ""Ḥabīb ibn Khidma Abū Rā'iṭa al-Takrītī's 'The Refutation of the Melkites Concerning the Union [of the Divinity and Humanity in Christ] (III)". In David Thomas (ed.). Christians at the Heart of Islamic Rule: Church Life and Scholarship in ʻAbbasid Iraq. Brill. pp. 39–55.
- Morony, Michael G. (2005). "History and Identity in the Syrian Churches". In Jan Jacob van Ginkel; Hendrika Lena Murre-Van Den Berg; Theo Maarten van Lint (eds.). Redefining Christian Identity: Cultural Interaction in the Middle East Since the Rise of Islam. Peeters Publishers. pp. 1–35.
- Palmer, Andrew (1990). Monk and Mason on the Tigris Frontier: The Early History of Tur Abdin. Cambridge University Press.
- Tannous, Jack (2020). The Making of the Medieval Middle East: Religion, Society, and Simple Believers. Princeton University Press.
- Witakowski, Witold (2011). "Quryaqos". In Sebastian P. Brock; Aaron M. Butts; George A. Kiraz; Lucas Van Rompay (eds.). Gorgias Encyclopedic Dictionary of the Syriac Heritage: Electronic Edition.

Preceded by Joseph	Syriac Orthodox Patriarch of Antioch; 793–817	Succeeded by Dionysius I Telmaharoyo
