= Simandu (West Syriac diocese) =

Simandu was an archdiocese of the Syriac Orthodox Church in Tzamandos, Cappadocia, attested between the tenth and twelfth centuries. Thirteen of its bishops are mentioned in the lists of Michael the Syriac and other Syriac Orthodox sources.

== Sources ==
The main primary source for the Syriac Orthodox metropolitans of Simandu is the record of episcopal consecrations appended to Volume III of the Chronicle of the Syriac Orthodox patriarch Michael the Syrian (1166–99). In this Appendix Michael listed most of the bishops consecrated by the Syriac Orthodox patriarchs of Antioch between the ninth and twelfth centuries. Twenty-eight Syriac Orthodox patriarchs sat during this period, and in many cases Michael was able to list the names of the bishops consecrated during their reigns, their monasteries of origin, and the place where they were consecrated.

Two twelfth-century bishops omitted from Michael's list are mentioned in the Chronicon Ecclesiasticum of the Syriac Orthodox maphrian Bar Hebraeus (ob.1286).

== Location ==
Simandu was a district near Melitene, known in Greek as Tzamandos. During the twelfth century it was included in the territories of the Frankish County of Edessa.

== Bishops and metropolitans of Simandu ==
Eleven Syriac Orthodox metropolitans of Simandu are mentioned in the lists of Michael the Syrian.

| Name | From | Consecrated in the reign of | Place of consecration |
|---|---|---|---|
| Yaʿqob | Unspecified | Iwanis II (954–7) | not known |
| Basil | Monastery of the Mother of God | Yohannan VI (965–86) | not known |
| Eliya | Monastery of Peter | Athanasius IV Laʿzar (987–1003) | Not known |
| Philoxenus | Mor Bar Sauma Monastery, Melitene | Dionysius IV Heheh (1032–42) | Not known |
| Ignatius | Monastery of Barid | Athanasius V Haya (1058–64) | not known |
| Athanasius | Monastery of Barid | Yohannan VIII bar Shushan (1063–73) | Harran |
| Yohannan ʿAbdon | Monastery of Bar Gaghi, Melitene | Basil II (1074–5) | Monastery of Mar Bar Sawma, Melitene |
| Basil | Monastery of Barid | Athanasius VI bar Khamoro (1091–1129) | not known |
| Mattai | Monastery of Beth Qenaya | Yohannan X Maudiana (1129–37) | not known |
| Basil | Monastery of Mar Ahron, Shigar | Athanasius VII bar Qutreh (1139–66) | not known |

Two twelfth-century bishops of Simandu omitted from the lists of Michael the Syrian are mentioned in the Chronicon Ecclesiasticum of Bar Hebraeus:

- Yohannan, previously bishop of Segestan, was awarded the diocese of Simandu at the synod of Kaishum in 1129, at the request of the Frankish count Joscelin I of Edessa.
- Bar Turkaya, bishop of Tel Bshir, was transferred to Simandu in or shortly after 1132, and after a short residence as bishop of Simandu was again transferred to Habora.

The diocese of Simandu seems to have lapsed around the end of the twelfth century, perhaps after the death of the bishop Basil (1139/1166).
