= Basil bar Shumna =

Bishop of Kaysun and Edessa from 1143 to c. 1170

Basil bar Shumna (Note: His surname is known only from its consonantal spelling, so its vowels are uncertain. It may also be spelled BarShumno, BarShumono, bar Shumono, bar Shumana, bar Shūmana, BarŠummānā, bar Shūmmānā, BarŠumnā, Bar Soumana, bar Shumnā, bar Sumno, bar Šūmōnō or bar Šmūnō. His first name may be spelled Basilius or Basileius. In Syriac he is ܚܣܝܐ ܒܐܣܝܠܝܘܣ ܕܐܘܪܗܝ, ḥasyā Bāsīlyūs d-ʾūrhāy, Saint Basil of Edessa.) (died 1169/1171) was the Syriac Orthodox metropolitan archbishop of Edessa from 1143 until his death. He wrote a Syriac chronicle covering the years from 1118 until his death, which is now lost but was used as a source by Michael the Great and the anonymous author of the Chronicle of 1234.

== Life ==
Basil was born probably early in the twelfth century, although he is described as an elderly man when he took over the diocese of Edessa. His brother Michael bar Shumna headed the administration of the city of Edessa under Count Joscelin II. (Note: According to the Chronicle of 1234, Michael held the post of medabberana in 1129 and was perhaps second only to the count in the city. He procured the release of Athanasius VII when the latter was detained by the emir of Amid. He may have even threatened the emir with raids. In 1138, he gathered an army at Samosata, including Frankish knights, to relieve Edessa from Turkish pressure, but was ambushed, taken captive and held as a slave.) In the early 1120s, Basil joined the retinue of the Byzantine emperor John II. He was an eyewitness to the defeat of the Pechenegs at the battle of Beroia in 1122. By 1129, Basil was an ordained priest and bishop of Qaysūn (Kʿesun). Patriarch John XI was living in Qaysūn at that time and considering making it his permanent residence. Growing disillusioned with ecclesiastical politics, Basil withdrew from Qaysūn to a monastery.

In 1143, Joscelin transferred Basil to Edessa from the diocese of Qaysūn. He was accused of having obtained the vacant see illegitimately, since Joscelin II was a Catholic who had no authority to transfer Syriac bishops and who had acted without the knowledge of Patriarch Athanasius VII. Basil denied the accusation in a letter to the patriarch. Joscelin and the patriarch were later reconciled.

At the start of the Siege of Edessa in November 1144, Basil joined with his Catholic and Armenian counterparts, Bishops Hugh and John, to organize the defence of the city. (Note: This is according to the Syriac sources. Alptekin sees Hugh as in overall command assisted by the other bishops.) He persuaded Hugh to seek a truce, but the offer did not reach the besieging Turkish commander, Zengi. During the two days of looting and massacre that followed the breaching of the walls on 24 December, Basil had himself led about on a rope, naked and with his beard shaven. Zengi encountered him when he entered the city after the two days. In Zengi's tent, Basil impressed the commander with his humility, courage and fluency in Arabic. Zengi had him dressed and the two of them discussed the rebuilding of the city. According to Michael the Great, "as long as Zengi ruled in Edessa [...] this venerable bishop was very influential." Basil was responsible for repopulating the city.

After the death of Zengi in 1146, Joscelin forced Basil to assist him in his effort to retake the city. When this failed and the city fell to Nur al-Din, Basil fled to Samosata. Having been accused of treason by the Edessenes for his close collaboration with Zengi, he was imprisoned in Hromgla by Joscelin. He remained in prison for three years. It was during this period that he began writing his history of the city. When Joscelin was captured by the Turks in 1150, it was Basil who had heard his last confession. He died in captivity nine years later.

Basil died in 1169 or 1171.

== Writings ==
Basil was a well-placed eyewitness to many of the events about which he wrote. The purpose of his work was theodical as well as historical. He sought to provide an explanation for the disasters that had befallen Edessa in his lifetime consistent with God's plan. He identified Edessa with the biblical Ur of the Chaldees, reading its Syriac name, Urhay, as a combination of words meaning city (ur) and Chaldees (hay).

Michael the Great uses Basil for the years 1118 to 1143. The anonymous author of the Chronicle of 1234 frequently cites Basil for the period after 1144. Most of his material on Edessa originates with Basil. He is clear that he is abridging Basil's longer account. He is also clear that he disagrees with Basil's sharp condemnation of his own flock.

Aphram Barsoum hypothesized that Basil wrote a separate work on the Byzantine victory over the Pechenegs in 1122. This is based on extracts found in Michael the Great. Although it would seem out of place, it is possible that the information was found in Basil's Edessene chronicle. Basil calls the Pechenegs Cumans. The existence of the treatise About the Cumans remains hypothetical.

Three dodecasyllabic poems on the fall of Edessa in 1144 have been attributed to Basil.

== Notes ==
Explanatory notes

Citations

== Bibliography ==
- Alptekin, Coşkun (1972). The Reign of Zengi (521–541/1127–1146) (PDF) (PhD dissertation). University of London.
- Amouroux-Mourad, Monique (1988). Le comté d'Edesse, 1098–1150. Paul Guethner.
- Barber, Malcolm (2012). The Crusader States. Yale University Press.
- Barsoum, Ignatius Aphram (2003). The Scattered Pearls: A History of Syriac Literature and Sciences. Translated by Matti Moosa (2nd revised ed.). Gorgias Press.
- Conrad, Lawrence I. (1992). "The Conquest of Arwad: A Source-Critical Study in the Historiography of the Early Medieval Near East". In L. I. Conrad; A. Cameron (eds.). The Byzantine and Early Islamic Near East: I. Problems in the Literary Source Material. Darwin Press. pp. 317–401.
- Hilkens, Andy (2014). The Anonymous Syriac Chronicle up to the Year 1234 and its Sources (PhD dissertation). Ghent University.
- Lau, Maximilian (2018). "The Dream Come True? Matthew of Edessa and the Return of the Roman Emperor". In B. Neil; E. Anagnostou-Laoutides (eds.). Dreams, Memory and Imagination in Byzantium. pp. 160–179. doi:10.1163/9789004375710. ISBN 9789004375710. S2CID 201515225.
- MacEvitt, Christopher (2007). The Crusades and the Christian World of the East: Rough Tolerance. University of Pennsylvania Press.
- Nicholson, Robert Lawrence (1973). Joscelyn III and the Fall of the Crusader States, 1134–1199. E. J. Brill.
- Van Nuffelen, Peter, ed. (2013–2017). "Basilius, bishop of Edessa". Clavis Historicorum Tardae Antiquitatis. Universiteit Gent.
- Weltecke, Dorothea (2003). "Contacts Between Syriac Orthodox and Latin Military Orders" (PDF). In Krijna Nelly Ciggaar; Herman G. B. Teule (eds.). East and West in the Crusader States: Context, Contacts, Confrontations III. Peeters. pp. 53–77.
- Weltecke, Dorothea (2009). "Les trois grandes chroniques syro-orthodoxes des XII^{e} et XIII^{e} siècles". In Muriel Debié (ed.). L'historiographie syriaque. Paul Guethner. pp. 107–135.
- Witakowski, Witold (2008). "Syriac Historiographical Sources". In Mary Whitby (ed.). Byzantines and Crusaders in Non-Greek Sources, 1025–1204. Oxford University Press. pp. 253–282.
- Witakowski, Witold (2011). "Historiography, Syriac". In Sebastian P. Brock; Aaron M. Butts; George A. Kiraz; Lucas Van Rompay (eds.). Gorgias Encyclopedic Dictionary of the Syriac Heritage. Gorgias Press.
- Wright, William (1894). A Short History of Syriac Literature (PDF). Adam and Charles Black. Archived from the original (PDF) on 2020-10-26.
