= John VII Sarigta =

65th Patriarch of Syriac Orthodox Church of Antioch (965-985)

- Syriac Orthodox Patriarch of Antioch and All the East
- Church: Syriac Orthodox Church
- Installed: 9 July 965
- Term ended: 985
- Predecessor: Abraham I
- Successor: Athanasius IV Salhoyo

Personal details
- Died: 985 Monastery of Bārid
- Residence: Monastery of Bārid

John VII Sarigta (Yōḥannān Sərīğteh) was the Syriac Orthodox Patriarch of Antioch, and head of the Syriac Orthodox Church from 965 until his death in 985.

== Biography ==
John was elected Syriac Orthodox Patriarch on 9 July 965. Between then and 968, he received an invitation (likely in form of a chrysobull, which has not survived) from the Byzantine emperor Nikephoros II Phokas to move with his fellow Syriacs to the newly reconquered territories around Melitene in order to repopulate the region. In return, Nikephoros promised to grant them religious freedom and protection from the Byzantine state church. John, taking the emperor at his word, decided to do so and started building the monastery of Bārid close to Melitene in 968, which became the seat of the Syriac Orthodox Patriarch.

Nevertheless, under pressure from the pugnacious Orthodox patriarch of Constantinople, Polyeuctos, Nikephoros invited John Sarigta for theological disputations to the capital. John started his journey in winter 969 took with him six companions, including the Syriac bishops of Apamea, Tzamandos, Zubatra and Germanicea. In Constantinople, John and his companions were detained and only set free after the death of Nikephoros II and Polyeuctos by Nikephoros' successor John I Tzimiskes in early 970. Upon return, John lived again in Barid which he continued to expand and where he was buried upon his death in 985.

Patriarch John ordained forty-six bishops during his reign. Among them were Timothy, Metropolitan of Mayyafarqat, and Zacharias, Bishop of Sarouj, both monks from the Monastery of al-Bared.

== Bibliography ==
- Cavanagh, Edward (25 May 2020). Empire and Legal Thought: Ideas and Institutions from Antiquity to Modernity. BRILL. ISBN 978-90-04-43124-9.
- Vest, Bernd Andreas (2007). Geschichte der Stadt Melitene und der umliegenden Gebiete: vom Vorabend der arabischen bis zum Abschluss der türkischen Eroberung (um 600-1124) (in German). Dr. Kovač. ISBN 978-3-8300-2575-7.
