= Michael V =

Michael V may refer to:

- Michael V Kalaphates (1015–1042), Byzantine Emperor
- Coptic Pope Michael V of Alexandria (fl. 1145–1146)
- Michael V. (born 1969), Filipino actor and comedian
