= John V of Alexandria =

John V of Alexandria may refer to:

- John the Merciful, Greek Patriarch of Alexandria in 610–619
- Pope John V of Alexandria, ruled in 1147–1166
