= Athanasius IV Salhoyo =

66th Patriarch of Syriac Orthodox Church of Antioch (986-1002)

- Syriac Orthodox Patriarch of Antioch and All the East
- Church: Syriac Orthodox Church
- See: Antioch
- Installed: 986/987
- Term ended: 1002/1003
- Predecessor: John VII Sarigta
- Successor: John VIII bar Abdoun

Personal details
- Born: Lazarus
- Died: 1002/1003

Athanasius IV Salhoyo was the Patriarch of Antioch and head of the Syriac Orthodox Church from 986/987 until his death in 1002/1003. (Note: (Arabic: اثناسيوس الرابع; Syriac: ܐܬܢܐܣܝܘܣ ܪܒܝܥܝܐ). He is counted as either Athanasius IV after Athanasius III, or Athanasius V after Athanasius Sandalaya, who is regarded as an illegitimate patriarch. Also known as Athanasios Loʿozar Ṣalḥoyo.)

== Biography ==
Lazarus studied and became a monk at the Monastery of Saint Aaron, in the vicinity of Callisura, a town near Melitene. Lazarus' sobriquet "Salhoyo" is interpreted by Aphrem Barsoum to reflect his origins in the town of Ṣalāḥiyya, east of Yarpuz, as opposed to the village of Ṣalaḥ in Tur Abdin. He was chosen to succeed John VII Sarigta as patriarch of Antioch and was consecrated on 21 October 986/987 (AG 1298) by Lazarus, metropolitan of Anazarbus, upon which he assumed the name Athanasius. (Note: Athanasius' ascension is placed either in 986, or 987. He was consecrated at the village of Qattina in the province of Homs, according to Michael the Syrian, whereas Bar Hebraeus places his consecration in the village of Qatini in the country of Gihon.) The Monastery of Bārid, the residence of Athanasius' predecessor John and located near Melitene, was renovated by Athanasius and became the latter's residence also.

According to the histories of Michael the Syrian and Bar Hebraeus, Athanasius was praised for his piety by Agapius II, the Chalcedonian (later termed Greek Orthodox) Patriarch of Antioch, in spite of their religious differences, who subsequently put an end to the persecution of non-Chalcedonians. The monk Gabriel is attested as syncellus (secretary) to Athanasius from 994 to 999. He served as patriarch of Antioch until his death in 1002/1003 (AG 1314) at the Mor Bar Sauma Monastery, where he was buried in the sacristy. As patriarch, Athanasius ordained thirty-nine bishops, as per Michael the Syrian's Chronicle, whereas Bar Hebraeus in his Ecclesiastical History credits Athanasius with the ordination of thirty-eight bishops.

== Works ==
In 1000, Athanasius compiled lectionaries from both the Old and New Testaments that were then recorded by his pupil the monk Romanus (Brit. Mus. MS. 258).

== Episcopal succession ==
As patriarch, Athanasius ordained the following bishops:

1. Paul, archbishop of Tarsus
2. Andreas, archbishop of Cyrrhus
3. John, bishop of Arsamosata
4. Isaac, bishop of Callisura
5. Peter, bishop of Sarug
6. Iwannis, bishop of Mardin, Reshʿayna, and Kfar Tutho
7. Philoxenus, archbishop of Dara
8. Christodulus, bishop of Baalbek
9. Cyril, bishop of Armenia
10. Moses, bishop of Samosata
11. Basil, archbishop of Balesh
12. Timothy, archbishop of Mabbogh
13. Iwannis, archbishop of Herat
14. Gregory, bishop of Birtha
15. Moses, archbishop of Raqqa
16. Philoxenus, bishop of Tella Qastra
17. Ignatius, archbishop of Tikrit
18. Basil, bishop of 'Arqa
19. John, bishop of Zeugma
20. Ignatius, archbishop of Edessa
21. Dioscorus, archbishop of Emesa
22. Joseph, bishop of Tur Abdin
23. Thomas, archbishop of Anazarbus
24. Dionysius, bishop of Claudia
25. Timothy, bishop of Aphrah
26. John, bishop of Tur Abdin
27. Gabriel, bishop of Aleppo
28. Theodosius, archbishop of Maipherqat
29. Iwannis, bishop of Arsamosata
30. Philoxenus, archbishop of Mabbogh and Gisra
31. Jacob, bishop of Baalbek
32. Daniel, bishop of Armenia
33. Thomas, archbishop of Tiberias
34. Peter, bishop of Arabissus
35. Abraham, bishop of Zeugma
36. John, bishop of Doliche
37. Elias, bishop of Simandu
38. Ignatius, bishop of Arzen
39. Iwannis, archbishop of Melitene

== Bibliography ==
- Barsoum, Ephrem (2003). The Scattered Pearls: A History of Syriac Literature and Sciences. Translated by Matti Moosa (2nd ed.). Gorgias Press.
- Burleson, Samuel; Rompay, Lucas van (2011). "List of Patriarchs of the Main Syriac Churches in the Middle East". In Sebastian P. Brock; Aaron M. Butts; George A. Kiraz; Lucas Van Rompay (eds.). Gorgias Encyclopedic Dictionary of the Syriac Heritage. Piscataway, NJ: Gorgias Press. pp. 481–491.
- Chabot, Jean-Baptiste, ed. (1905). Chronique de Michel le Syrien (in French). Vol. III. Paris: Ernest Leroux.
- Mazzola, Marianna, ed. (2018). Bar 'Ebroyo's Ecclesiastical History : writing Church History in the 13th century Middle East. PSL Research University.
- Moosa, Matti, ed. (2014). The Syriac Chronicle of Michael Rabo (the Great): A Universal History from the Creation. Beth Antioch Press.
- Palmer, Andrew (1990). Monk and Mason on the Tigris Frontier: The Early History of Tur Abdin. Cambridge University Press.
- Wilmshurst, David (2016). Bar Hebraeus The Ecclesiastical Chronicle: An English Translation. Gorgias Press.
- Wilmshurst, David (2019). "West Syrian patriarchs and maphrians". In Daniel King (ed.). The Syriac World. Routledge. pp. 806–813.

| Preceded by John VII Sarigta | Syriac Orthodox Patriarch of Antioch; 986/987–1002/1003 | Succeeded by John VIII bar Abdoun |
