= Shaarawy =

Shaarawy (or Al Shaarawy, Al Shaarawi, etc.) is an Arabic surname. Notable people with the surname include:

- Muhammad Metwally Al Shaarawy (1911–1988), Egypt Islamic scholar and jurist
- Stephan El Shaarawy (born 1992), Italian football player of Egyptian descent
