= Theodoros bar Wahbun =

Anti-Patriarch of Syriac Orthodox Church of Antioch from 1180 to 1193

Theodoros (or Theodore) bar Wahbun (died 1193) was a Syriac Orthodox monk and writer who was elected patriarch of Antioch in 1180 in opposition to the reigning patriarch, Michael Rabo. Using the name John, he continued as an anti-patriarch in exile until his death. He pursued ecumenism and the union of the churches.

== Monk and diplomat ==
Theodoros was born in Melitene to the priest Sahdo bar Wahbun. He was educated in theology, philosophy and languages, acquiring literacy in Arabic, Armenian, Greek and Syriac. He joined the monastery of Mor Bar Sauma and also became a priest. In the 1170s, without leaving his monastery, he worked as a secretary to Patriarch Michael Rabo. He represented the patriarch in negotiations with Theorianos, who was acting on behalf of the Byzantine Emperor to secure the union of the Miaphysite (Syriac and Armenian) and Chalcedonian churches. Negotiations took place in Armenian Cilicia.

The first negotiations began perhaps as early as 1170 and involved, besides Theorianos and Theodoros, the Syriac bishop of Kʿesun, John, and the Armenian catholicos, Nerses IV. These took place in Hromgla. In 1172, the two Syriac negotiators met with Theorianos in Kʿesun in Zengid territory without the Armenians. Although Theorianos was supposed to meet Michael at Mar Barsauma, Theodoros told him that he had received information about an ambush being planned by the Muslims and advised the Byzantine agent not to go. The Byzantine and the patriarch therefore communicated through letters. Theorianos and Theodoros negotiated in Greek, and a transcript of their exchange in Greek was made for the Emperor Manuel Komnenos. Theorianos cut off the discussion after Theodoros insisted on citing Aristotle. The bishop of Kʿesun took over negotiations thereafter.

== Anti-patriarch ==
John
- Patriarch of the Syriac Orthodox Church
- Native name: Theodoros bar Wahbun
- See: Syriac Orthodox Church
- In office: 1180–1193
- Opposed to: Michael the Syrian

Personal details
- Died: 1193

When Michael came to suspect Theodoros of plotting his downfall, he had him expelled from Mar Barsauma. In 1180, four Mesopotamian bishops opposed to Michael met at Amid to elect Theodoros patriarch. He took the name John (Yuḥanon). His goal was to unite the Syriac Orthodox with the Chalcedonian churches, both Greek and Latin. The support of the prominent and influential bishop of Amid demonstrates that there was a serious appetite in part of the Syriac hierarchy for ecumenism. Michael, however, succeeded in capturing him. A synod was held to defrock him and relegate him to lay status, after which he was imprisoned in his former monastery. After escaping, he went to Jerusalem, where the Latin patriarch, Eraclius, gave him protection in return for his formal submission to the Roman pontiff.

Two letters Theodoros wrote from Jerusalem are known. In that addressed to the metropolitan bishop of Tarsus, he seeks to justify his election. In that addressed to Michael Rabo, he seeks reconciliation. After the fall of Jerusalem to the Muslim Ayyubids in 1187, he left for Armenian Cilicia and Hromgla. In 1192, Prince Leo II, soon to be king, and Armenian catholicos Gregory IV recognized him as the legitimate patriarch of Antioch. He continued to have adherents among the Syriac Orthodox, but he had no successor. The schism within the Miaphysite church ended with his sudden death in 1193.

== Writings ==
In Syriac, Theodoros wrote an anaphora, an explanation (ʿelta) of the Syriac Orthodox liturgy and two poems.

== Bibliography ==
- Cowe, S. Peter (2006). "The Armenians in the Era of the Crusades, 1050–1350". In Michael Angold (ed.). The Cambridge History of Christianity, Volume 5: Eastern Christianity. Cambridge: Cambridge University Press. pp. 404–429. doi:10.1017/CHOL9780521811132.018. ISBN 9781139054089.
- Kaufhold, Hubert (1990). "Zur syrischen Kirchengeschichte des 12. Jahrhunderts: Neue Quellen über Theodoros bar Wahbun". Oriens Christianus. 74: 115–151.
- Kaufhold, Hubert (2018) [2011]. "Theodoros bar Wahbun". In Sebastian P. Brock; Aaron M. Butts; George A. Kiraz; Lucas Van Rompay (eds.). Gorgias Encyclopedic Dictionary of the Syriac Heritage: Electronic Edition. Beth Mardutho.
- MacEvitt, Christopher (2007). The Crusades and the Christian World of the East: Rough Tolerance. Philadelphia: University of Pennsylvania Press. ISBN 9780812240504.
- Richard, Jean (2004). "The Eastern Churches". In Luscombe, David; Riley-Smith, Jonathan (eds.). The New Cambridge Medieval History, Volume 4, c.1024–c.1198, Part 1. Cambridge: Cambridge University Press. pp. 564–598. ISBN 978-1-13905402-7.
