= Monastery of Bārid =

Former Syriac Orthodox monastery in Turkey

Monastery information
- Established: 969
- Disestablished: After 1213
- Diocese: Diocese of Gihon

People
- Founder: John VII Sarigta

Site
- Location: Near Süleymanlı, Kahramanmaraş Province, Turkey

The Monastery of Bārid (Arabic: دير البارد; Syriac: ܕܝܪܐ ܕܒܐܪܝܕ) was a Syriac Orthodox monastery near Kahramanmaraş in Turkey. It produced one patriarch, one maphrian, and eighteen bishops and metropolitan bishops.

== Etymology ==
The name of the monastery seems to go back to the stream of Nahra də-Qarrīrē, which translates to "river of the cold waters", as bārid in Arabic means cold. The connection with the Arabic barīd, "postal service", is therefore likely to be excluded.

== History ==
A church and monastery was constructed at Bārid (Syriac: Qariro, lit. 'cold') in 969 (AG 1280) by the Syriac Orthodox patriarch John VII Sarigta following the invitation of the Roman Emperor Nikephoros II Phokas. According to the Chronicle of Michael the Syrian, the patriarch and the emperor had agreed that the former would come with his co-religionists and establish his residence in the region of Malatya and its environs on the condition that they received an imperial guarantee of religious tolerance. Some Syriac Orthodox Christians had already resettled the region after the Roman reconquest of Malatya by the domestikos John Kourkouas in 934. Although Nikephoros II reneged on his promises and imprisoned John VII for his refusal to accept the Council of Chalcedon briefly prior to his usurpation by John I Tzimiskes, the patriarch returned to the Monastery of Bārid upon his release and undertook renovations. John VII resided at the Monastery of Bārid until his death in 985 and was buried there.

The monastery was renovated and maintained as the patriarchal residence by John VII's successor Athanasius IV Salhoyo (r. 986/987–1002/1003). John VIII bar Abdoun was residing at the Monastery of Bārid when he was detained and placed under house arrest at Malatya by the krites Chrysoberges in 1028. More than a thousand monks inhabited the monastery at this time. Persecution of Syriac Orthodox Christians ensured that most subsequent patriarchs resided outside of Roman territory until the Seljuk victory at the Battle of Manzikert in 1071 weakened the Roman grasp of the region. Iwannis III (r. 1086–1087/1088) died and was buried at the monastery. Iwannis III's successor Dionysius VI (r. 1088–1090) was archimandrite of the Monastery of Bārid prior to his accession as patriarch.

Around 1158/59, some Turks plundered the monastery and killed four monks. Patriarch Michael the Syrian was forced to stay in the winter of 1167/68 in the monastery due to the ongoing conflict between the Zengid Nur ad-Din and Bohemond III of Antioch. The monastery continued as a centre of learning until the twelfth century and is not mentioned again after 1213.

== Location ==
The monastery was likely located on the Berit Daği near the River Giḥun and the village of Zeytun (today called Süleymanlı).

== Bibliography ==
- Barsoum, Aphrem (2003). The Scattered Pearls: A History of Syriac Literature and Sciences. Translated by Matti Moosa (2nd ed.). Gorgias Press.
- Chatonnet, Francoise Briquel; Debie, Muriel (20 June 2023). The Syriac World: In Search of a Forgotten Christianity. Yale University Press. ISBN 978-0-300-27125-6.
- Gyllenhaal, David (2021). "Byzantine Melitene and the Social Milieu of the Syriac Renaissance". Dumbarton Oaks Papers. 75: 205–236. ISSN 0070-7546.
- Mazzola, Marianna (2018). Bar 'Ebroyo's Ecclesiastical History : writing Church History in the 13th century Middle East. Université Paris sciences et lettres; Universiteit Gent.
- Moosa, Matti, ed. (2014). The Syriac Chronicle of Michael Rabo (the Great): A Universal History from the Creation. Beth Antioch Press.
- Takahashi, Hidemi (2011). "Barṣawmo, Dayro d-Mor". In Sebastian P. Brock; Aaron M. Butts; George A. Kiraz; Lucas Van Rompay (eds.). Gorgias Encyclopedic Dictionary of the Syriac Heritage: Electronic Edition. Gorgias Press.
- Todt, Klaus-Peter; Vest, Andreas (2014). "Syria (Syria Prote, Syria Deutera, Syria Euphratsia)". Tabula Imperii Byzantini. 15. Österreichische Akademie der Wissenschaften.
- Vest, Bernd Andreas (2007). Geschichte der Stadt Melitene und der umliegenden Gebiete: vom Vorabend der arabischen bis zum Abschluss der türkischen Eroberung (um 600-1124) (in German). Dr. Kovač. ISBN 978-3-8300-2575-7.
