= Daqadus =

Village in Dakahlia Governorate, Egypt

Daqadus دقادوس
- Village
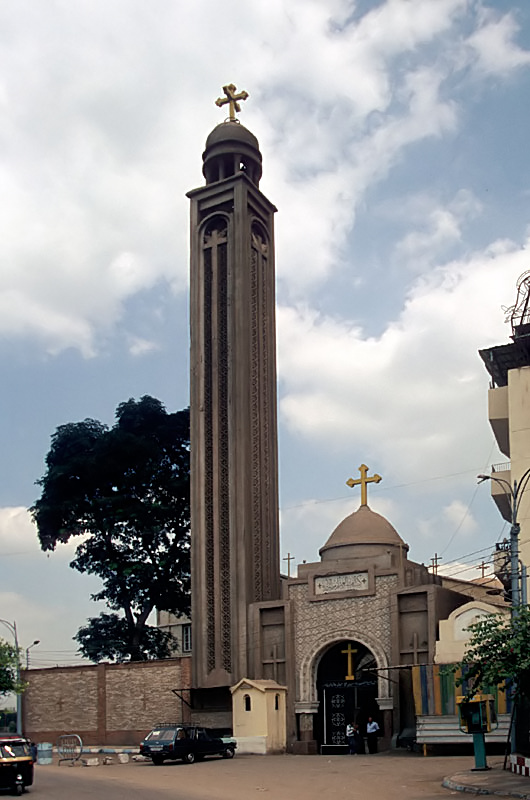
- Church of the Virgin Mary

- Location in Egypt
- Coordinates: 30.7253°N 31.2664°E
- Country: Egypt
- Governorate: Dakahlia
- Time zone: UTC+2 (EET)
  - Summer (DST): UTC+3 (EEST)

Daqadus (Arabic: دقادوس) is a village in Mit Ghamr, Dakahlia Governorate, Egypt. It is called the second section of Mit Ghamr, as it is considered an urban extension of the city and is separated from the city only by the railway line. Daqadus contains the Mit Ghamr General Hospital and is the birthplace of Imam Muhammad Metwalli al-Sha'rawi and Pope Michael V of Alexandria. It also contains the Church of the Virgin Mary, Al-Baz Mosque, and the Great Mosque (Al-Arbaeen), which was rebuilt by Muhammad Metwally Al-Shaarawy.

In Christianity, Dadaqus is part of the Holy Family trail in Egypt.

A mawlid is held in August in Daqadus for the "Virgin of Daqadus".
