= Mark Ibn Kunbar =

12th-century Coptic priest

- Born: 1130–1140? Sunbat, Gharbia, Egypt
- Died: 18 February 1208; Dayr al-Qusayr, Asyut, Egypt
- Occupation: Coptic priest

Mark ad-Darir ibn Mauhub, or Mark Ibn Kunbar (Arabic: مرقس بن قنبر المُنْشَقّ, romanized: Marqus ibn Qunbar al-Munšaqq), died 1208, also known as Mark the Blind, was a 12th-century Coptic priest and preacher. He came into conflict with both Pope John V and Pope Mark III of Alexandria for preaching against the practice of private confession of sins, and was excommunicated.

== Life ==
Mark was most likely born in Sunbat, near Zefta, Gharbia, Egypt. He was likely born blind, thus the epithet.

He was made priest by the bishop of Damietta. As priest, Mark Ibn Kunbar preached against the common practice of taking censers into personal homes for the confession of sins. Traditionally, sins were confessed at a confessional, and a censer would be placed nearby for the purpose of purifying the surrounding air. Mark Ibn Kunbar objected strongly to this form of private confession, insisting that a priest must be present for the absolution of sins. He was an eloquent preacher, and drew many crowds in Egypt who heard his sermons and received from him absolution from their sins. He also preached to the Samaritans, resulting in Samaritan Coptic conversions. He also preached against various other issues, including circumcision. His followers were called the "Qanabira". Tensions rose between Mark Ibn Kunbar and the then Pope John V of Alexandria, head of the Coptic church, resulting in the excommunication of Mark Ibn Kunbar on the false grounds of sexual immorality. Nevertheless, Mark Ibn Kunbar continued to preach and draw crowds. During this time he also wrote books and commentaries on the Bible, including translations of the Bible from Coptic to Arabic.

In 1164, John died, and Pope Mark III of Alexandria took office in 1166. The bishops of Upper Egypt wrote to Pope Mark about Mark Ibn Kunbar and the Pope arranged to meet him in person. He was convinced by the Coptic Pope during that meeting to correct his actions. He kept quiet for a little while, but then recommenced his preachings against the teachings of the Coptic church. In 1173, Pope Mark then called a synod of sixty bishops at The Hanging Church in Egypt. The synod unanimously resolved against Mark Ibn Kunbar's teachings and excommunicated him once again. He was placed on guard at the Monastery of Saint Anthony. He and his family pleaded with Pope Mark to let him go, and he vowed to not return to his preaching again. Pope Mark relented, and he returned to Egypt, and once again began teaching against the Pope.

Mark Ibn Kunbar then appealed to the Muslim sultan, Saladin, saying that he had not gone against the original teachings of the church, and insisting on a fair trial in the Church. The Muslim rulers commanded Pope Mark to give him a fair trial, but the Church refused to do so under the authority of the Sultan. In 1179, Michael, the metropolitan of Damietta, wrote an official condemnation of Mark Ibn Kunbar for the Coptic Church. However, Pope Mark accepted arbitration of a trial by Patriarch Michael I of Antioch, who sided with neither party. Potentially afraid of another excommunication in his home church, Mark Ibn Kunbar left the Coptic church and joined the local Melkite sect instead. Although Patriarch Michael eventually supported Mark Ibn Kunbar's position of confession to a priest, he excommunicated him for his Chalcedonianism.

In 1186, Mark Ibn Kunbar met Patriarch Sophronius II of Constantinople, and requested a church in Zefta, but this request was declined. Then he went back to the Coptic church, who accepted him once again. However, he lost his followers by becoming Coptic again, and he returned once again to the Melkites. Once again, he attempted to return to the Coptic faith, but this time he was rejected by Pope Mark. On hearing of his relapse to the Miaphysite Coptics, Sophronius rebuked him and sent him to the Melkite monastery in Dayr Al-Qusayr, near modern-day El Quseyya, in the Asyut Governorate of Egypt. Mark Ibn Kunbar spent his last days there and died on 18 February, 1208.

== Writings ==
Mark Ibn Kunbar was one of the first to translate of the Bible into Arabic, after Saadia Gaon. His commentaries of Genesis, Exodus, and Leviticus, most likely written after his conversion to Chalcedonianism, all have several different recensions. His commentaries were often wrongly attributed to Cyril of Alexandria or Ephrem the Syrian by ancient scribes. Mark employed allegorical interpretation methods and typological exegesis in his commentaries, and he often noted how the Pentateuch showed the Trinity, Jesus Christ, church institutions, and ascetic monastic life. The commentaries also strongly show Mark's unique convictions, like confession to a priest and doing penance. The commentary's Christology is Chalcedonian, and the verses are organized according to the traditional Melkite liturgical divisions, leading scholars to believe that he wrote the commentary after he became a Melkite.

He also wrote the Book of Confessions and the Book of the Master and Disciple which were made popular by Pope Cyril III of Alexandria in the next century.

== Doctrines and practices ==
Mark Ibn Kunbar argued that one must confess one's sins to a priest and do penance to obtain absolution of sins, and take communion, to go to heaven. He also allowed men to grow long hair. He preached that circumcision is for the Jews and Muslims, not for Christians. He also opposed the burning of sandarac in churches, but allowed only frankincense as incense in worship.

He was also accused of calling the Holy Spirit feminine, though it may have just been a note that the gender of ruah, the Hebrew word for spirit, is feminine.

== Legacy ==
The conflict that Mark Ibn Kunbar raised is now seen as the first time auricular confession was an important topic in Coptic history. Although Mark Ibn Kunbar was firmly rejected and his followers dispersed, his discussion on the necessity of confession to a priest carried on to the next century in the writings of Pope Cyril III of Alexandria, who published Mark Ibn Kunbar's Book of the Master and Disciple. Mark's doctrine of auricular confession eventually became the official teaching of the Coptic church.

John Mason Neale, a nineteenth-century scholar, has compared Mark Ibn Kunbar with the seventeenth-century English clergyman William Chillingworth because of the controversies and defiance of the church of both men.
