= Pope Mark III of Alexandria =

Head of the Coptic Church from 1166 to 1189

- Pope of Alexandria and Patriarch of the See of St. Mark
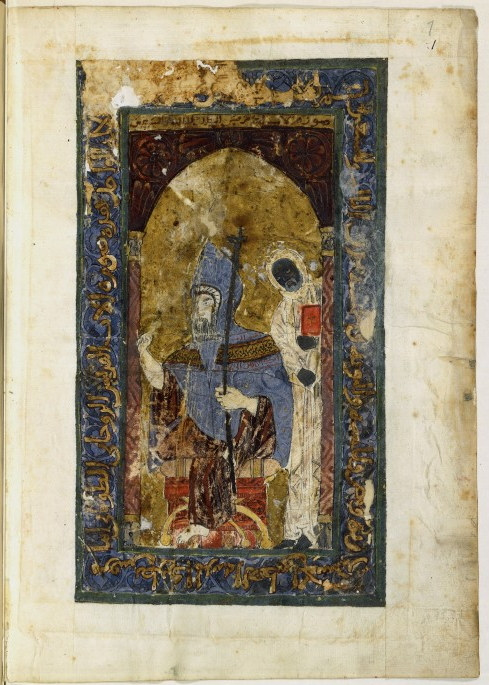
- Papacy began: 1166
- Papacy ended: 1189
- Predecessor: John V
- Successor: John VI

Personal details
- Born: Alexandria, Egypt
- Died: 1189 Egypt
- Buried: Monastery of Saint Macarius the Great
- Denomination: Coptic Orthodox Christian
- Residence: The Hanging Church

Pope Mark III of Alexandria, 73rd Pope of Alexandria and Patriarch of the See of St. Mark. He was the son of Zura, and he is commemorated in the Coptic Synaxarion on the 6th day of Tubah.

Before becoming Patriarch, Mark wrote the entries of the History of the Patriarchs of Alexandria that covers the years between 1131 and 1167.

At the start of Mark's papacy, the bishops of Upper Egypt wrote to Mark about the previously excommunicated Mark Ibn Kunbar. The Pope met Kunbar in person brought him to repentance. Afterwards, Kunbar continued to preach against the practice of private confession of sins. In 1173, Pope Mark called a synod of sixty bishops at The Hanging Church, which unanimously excommunicated Kunbar from the Coptic church for the second time.

| Preceded by John V | Coptic Pope; 1166–1189 | Succeeded by John VI |
