= Pope John V of Alexandria =

Head of the Coptic Church from 1147 to 1166

- Pope of Alexandria and Patriarch of the See of St. Mark
- Papacy began: 25 August 1147
- Papacy ended: 29 April 1166
- Predecessor: Michael V
- Successor: Mark III

Personal details
- Born: Egypt
- Died: 29 April 1166 Egypt
- Buried: Monastery of Saint Macarius the Great
- Denomination: Coptic Orthodox Christian
- Residence: The Hanging Church

Pope John V of Alexandria, 72nd Pope of Alexandria and Patriarch of the See of St. Mark. He was initially a monk in the Monastery of Saint John the Dwarf in Scetes. He was enthroned as a Pope of Alexandria on the second day of Pi Kogi Enavot, 863 A.M. (25 August 1147).

During his papacy, the Copts were persecuted by the Muslim governors and caliphs. Many were killed and sold as slaves. Several churches in Cairo, such as the church of Saint Menas in Saint Mary Church (Haret Elroum) and the church of El-Zohari, were plundered and destroyed. They were later rebuilt by the Coptic layman Abu El-Fakhr Salib Ibn Mikhail. It was also at this time (1164 AD) that Saint Bashnouna was killed by the Muslims. Around the end of his papacy, tensions rose between him and Mark Ibn Kunbar, a priest who preached against the practice of private confession of sins, resulting in Kunbar's excommunication.

According to the History of the Patriarchs of Alexandria, the Emperor of Ethiopia wrote to John in 1152 for a new abuna or Metropolitan, because Abuna Mikael was too old; his request was denied. Although the name of the Emperor was not recorded, Carlo Conti Rossini identified him as Mara Takla Haymanot, arguing from this exchange that the true reason a new abuna was wanted was that Abuna Mikael refused to acknowledge the legitimacy of the new Zagwe dynasty. Pope John denied this request and was subsequently arrested and imprisoned for two weeks during the reign of the Fatimid caliph Al-Zafir.

During John's papacy, the expression Life-giving was added to the liturgical confession, which became: This is the Life-giving Flesh that Thine Only-Begotten Son, Our Lord, God and Savior, Jesus Christ, took from our Lady ....

Pope John V died on 4 Pashons, 882 A.M. (29 April 1166 AD) after 18 years, 8 months, and 4 days on the Throne of Saint Mark.

Preceded by Michael V	Coptic Pope; 1147–1166	Succeeded by Mark III
