= Chronicle of 1234 =

The Chronicle of 1234 (Latin: Chronicon ad annum Christi 1234 pertinens) is an anonymous West Syriac universal history from Creation until 1234. The unknown author was probably from Edessa. The Chronicle only survives in fragments, from which it is known to be divided into two parts: the first on ecclesiastical history, the second on secular. It was critically edited and translated by the French Orientalist Jean-Baptiste Chabot in 1920 (volume I covering ecclesiastical history) and by Albert Abouna in 1974 (volume II covering secular history).

Unique among Syriac chronicles it depends in part on the Book of Jubilees. The author also used the lost Ecclesiastical History of Dionysius of Tell Maḥrē for his coverage of the eighth through ninth centuries. He also uses Theophilus of Edessa (possibly through an Arabic translator) and al-Azdī, an Arabic author. Some of Theophilus's history now lost to us survives in the Chronicle of 1234, such as his account of the Trojan War. The Chronicle also uses the late twelfth-century correspondence of the Syriac patriarch Michael the Great for its most recent history.

The Chronicle of 1234 is best as a primary source for events surrounding the Crusades and the Kingdom of Cilicia in the late twelfth century and early thirteenth.

== Editions and translations ==
- Anonymi auctoris chronicon ad annum 1234 pertinens [Anonymous Syriac chronicle of 1203-1204], ed. by J.-B. Chabot, Corpus scriptorum christianorum orientalium, Scriptores syri, series iii, 14-15 (Paris, 1920), pp. 118-26 [edition].
- Anonymi auctoris chronicon ad a.c. 1234 pertinens, vol. II, trans. by Albert Abouna, Corpus scriptorum christianorum orientalium, Scriptores syri, tomus 154, vol. 354 (Louvain, 1974) archive.org
- 'Un épisode de l'histoire des croisades, ou la prise d'Edesse en 1144, par l'atabek de Mossoul, d'après une chronique syriaque', trans. by J.-B. Chabot, in Mélanges offerts à m. Gustave Schlumberger, membre de l'Institut, à l'occasion du quatre-vingtième anniversaire de sa naissance (17 octobre 1924), 2 vols (Paris: Geuthner, 1924), I 169-79 [partial translation].
- A. S. Tritton and H. A. R. Gibb (trans.), 'The First and Second Crusades from an Anonymous Syriac Chronicle', Journal of the Royal Asiatic Society of Great Britain and Ireland, 1 (January 1933), 69-101; 2 (April 1933), 273-305 [partial translation].

== Sources ==
- Brock, Sebastian P. (1980). "Syriac Historical Writing: A Survey of the Main Sources" (PDF). Journal of the Iraq Academy: Syriac Corporation. 5 (1979-1980): 1–30, (326-297).
- Brock, Sebastian P. (1997). A Brief Outline of Syriac Literature. Kottayam: St. Ephrem Ecumenical Research Institute.
- Ciggaar, Krijna Nelly and Teule, Herman G. B., edd. (1999). East and West in the Crusader States: Context, Contacts, Confrontations II: Acta of the Congress Held at Hernen Castle in May 1997. Peeters Publishers. ISBN 90-429-0786-X.
- Debié, Muriel (2009). "Syriac Historiography and Identity Formation". Church History and Religious Culture. 89 (1–3): 93–114. doi:10.1163/187124109X408014.
- Debié, Muriel; Taylor, David G. K. (2012). "Syriac and Syro-Arabic Historical Writing, c. 500-c. 1400". The Oxford History of Historical Writing. Vol. 2. Oxford: Oxford University Press. pp. 155–179. ISBN 978-0-19-923642-8.
- Ginkel, Jan J. van (2011). "Chronicle of 1234". Gorgias Encyclopedic Dictionary of the Syriac Heritage. Piscataway, NJ: Gorgias Press. p. 97.
- Morony, Michael G. (2005). "History and Identity in the Syrian Churches". Redefining Christian Identity: Cultural Interaction in the Middle East Since the Rise of Islam. Leuven: Peeters Publishers. pp. 1–33. ISBN 9789042914186.
- Robinson, Chase F. (2000). Empire and Elites After the Muslim Conquest: The Transformation of Northern Mesopotamia. Cambridge: Cambridge University Press. ISBN 0-521-78115-9.
- Witakowski, Witold (2011). "Historiography, Syriac". Gorgias Encyclopedic Dictionary of the Syriac Heritage. Piscataway, NJ: Gorgias Press. pp. 199–203.
- Wright, William (1894). A Short History of Syriac Literature. London: Adam and Charles Black.
