= Muhammad Metwalli al-Sha'rawi =

Egyptian Islamic scholar (1911–1998)

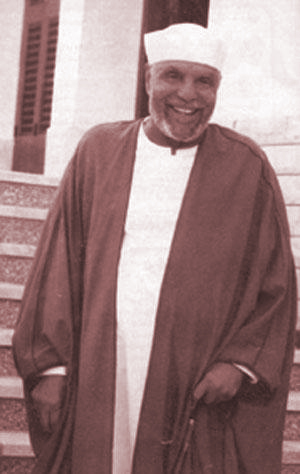
- Al-Sha'rawi in 1987

Minister of Awqaf

Egyptian Muslim Scholar
- In office 9 November 1976 – 5 October 1978
- President: Anwar Sadat
- Prime Minister: Mamdouh Salem
- Preceded by: Muhammad Hussein al-Dhahabi
- Succeeded by: Mohammed Abdel Rahman Bisar

Personal details
- Born: April 15, 1911 Daqadus, Dakahlia, Khedivate of Egypt
- Died: June 17, 1998 (aged 87) Egypt

Muhammad Metwalli al-Sha'rawi (Arabic: محمد متولي الشعراوي) (April 15, 1911 – June 17, 1998) was an Islamic scholar, former Egyptian minister of Endowments. He has been called one of Egypt's most popular and successful Islamic preachers, and "one of the most prominent symbols of popular Egyptian culture" in the 1970s, 1980s and 1990s.

== Birth and early life ==
Muhammad Metwalli al-Sha'rawi was born on April 15, 1911, in the village of Daqadus, Mit Ghamr, Ad Daqahliyah, Egypt. In 1916, at five years old, he joined a Zagazig elementary institution. By the age of 11, he had completely memorised the Quran. In 1923, he earned his elementary certificate, joining the secondary institution afterward. During this time, his interest in poetry and literature had grown and he went on to be elected leader of the Student Union at the institution.

A turning point in his life, when his father sent him, paying for his living expenses, to further his education in Al-Azhar, Cairo. Al-Sha'rawi wanted to stay with his brothers to cultivate land. Trying to avoid going to Cairo he placed what seemed an impossible condition. The condition was for his father to buy him a number of books related to heritage, language and Quran science. But his father caught on to that trick, and bought him all requested material, saying "I know my son that all of these books are not prescribed to you, but I preferred to buy in order to provide you the draws of the science."

In 1937, he joined the College of Arabic Language and became active in the nationalist movement and Al-Azhar movement, participating in the anti-colonial rallies and related gatherings. He graduated from Faculty of Arabic language at Al-Azhar University in 1941.

== Career ==
al-Sha'rawi

After graduating in 1941, he went on to earn his teaching certification in 1943. He later graduated from the religious institution of Tanta, before moving to another at Zagazig and then, finally, at Alexandria. In 1950, he moved to Saudi Arabia to work as professor of Sharee'ah in the University of Ummul-Quraa. In 1960, Institute of Tanta Azhary appointed him as the director of the Islamic Call. In 1961, the Ministry of Awqaf appointed him as inspector of Sciences. In 1963 he returned to Egypt and served as the Director of the Grand Sheikh of Al-Azhar. However, the diplomatic relations between Egypt and Saudi Arabia worsened and it became impossible for him to return to Saudi Arabia. Instead, he took the position of manager of the office of the Imam of Al-Azhar, Hasan al Ma'amoon. In 1966, he traveled to Algeria as the head of Al-Azhar Mission and remained for seven years. During his stay in Algeria, the war of June 1967 occurred and Egypt suffered tremendous losses to Israel. Al-Sha'rawi 'praised' the defeat, saying "Egypt did not gain victory while the hands of communism surrounds them and their religion remains uncorrupted." Later, he did get to return to teach at the King Abdul Azeez University in Saudi Arabia. In 1970, he was appointed a visiting professor at King Abdulaziz University Faculty of Sharia in Mecca, then President of the Department of Graduate Studies at King Abdul Aziz in 1972.

In November 1976, Mamdouh Salem, then Prime Minister, chose the members of his cabinet, among them was al-Sha'rawi, appointed Minister of Endowments until October 1978. During this time, he issued a law that helped establish the first Islamic bank in Egypt in 1979. The bank, Faisal Islamic Bank, was approved by the People's Assembly during that time. Then he flew to Saudi Arabia where he taught at the University of King Abdul Aziz for only one year in 1981.

In 1987, he was selected as a member of Arabic language Complex. He was also nominated to become a member Arabic compound (immortal compound) after receiving a majority of votes.

Al-Sha'rawi was host of a successful Friday afternoon TV program that was themed around preaching Islam.

Al-Sha'rawi had a very widespread popularity which earned him the title of "The preacher of the century." Al-Sha'rawi was exceptionally talented in explaining the meanings of the Quran. His real talent was best shown when he explained in simple words the meaning behind the most difficult verses of the Qur'an. He was also famous for being the only non-Saudi to give the khutbah, or Islamic speech at Mount Arafat, a mountain of central importance during the Hajj, or the Islamic pilgrimage to Saudi Arabia.

One reflection of his influence was the Egyptian parliament's repeated blocking of legislation permitting organ-transplant operations, after al-Sha'rawi issued a Fatwā declaring such operations Haraam (sinful)(in case organs are sold and not just "donated") on the grounds that `humans do not own their bodies`.

Although he was initially close with the founder of the Muslim Brotherhood, Al-Sha'rawi later criticized the group for their hasty actions and resort to violence.

== Family ==
Al-Sha'rawi married at a relatively young age as per the wish of his mother who also chose a wife for him. He complied with his mother's decision and had three boys and two girls. The boys were named Sami, Abdur Raheem and Ahmad, the girls, Faatimah and Saalihah.

== Death ==
On June 17, 1998, al-Sha'rawi died with little known about the details surrounding his death. Some news outlets report that he died from a heart attack, while other sources say it was because of a worsening of his asthma that he had been hospitalized for. Reportedly more than a million mourners packed Cairo's streets in a display of grief.

== Television ==
In 2002, a television series, Imam of the Missionaries, was produced by Egyptian television and aired on different networks. The series discussed al-Sha'rawi's life in detail. The series was in four parts. The first focused on the young al-Sha'rawi's education, the second, as a young adult, the third, on his position as minister and the last part focused on the later years of his life.

== Works ==
Al-Sha'rawi's works include:

- Israa and Mi'raaj
- Secrets of In the name of Allah, the Most Beneficent, the Most Merciful
- Islaam and modern thinking
- Islaam and women, curriculum and religion
- Prayers and Pillars Islaam
- The Path to Allaah
- Ruling ( Fataawaa)
- Hundred Question and Answer in the Islaamic Fiqh
- The woman as Allaah Desires
- The Miracle of Qur'aan
- This is Islaam
- "The accepted Hajj " (Hajj Mabrour, in Arabic: الحجّ المبرور).

== See also ==
- Mustafa Mahmoud
- Mohammed al-Ghazali
- Ali al-Jifri
- List of Ash'aris
