= Mor Bar Sauma Monastery =

Syriac Orthodox Church monastery close to Melitene, Turkey

- Location within Turkey
- Interactive map of Mor Bar Sauma Monastery

Monastery information
- Established: Mid-5th century
- Disestablished: After 1675/1676
- Dedication: Mōr Barṣawmō

Site
- Location: Kaplı Dağı, Adıyaman Province, Turkey
- Coordinates: 38°1′1″N 38°49′53″E
- Public access: Yes

The Mor Bar Sauma Monastery was a Syriac Orthodox monastery located between Gargar and Malatya in Turkey. (Note: (Arabic: دير مار برصوم, Syriac: ܕܝܪܐ ܕܡܪܝ ܒܪܨܘܡܐ, romanized: Dayro d-Mor Barṣawmo or Umrō d-Morī Barṣawmō). Also called the Monastery of the Cave by some writers as it resembled a citadel.) The monastery served as the regular patriarchal residence from the eleventh century until the thirteenth century, and was eventually abandoned in the seventeenth century. It produced five patriarchs and forty-three metropolitan bishops. Between 1074 and 1283 several synods took place at the monastery.

== History ==
=== Origin ===
The Mor Bar Sauma Monastery was founded in the mid-fifth century and named after Mōr Barṣawmō, a popular saint amongst Syriac Orthodox Christians, of whom the monastery had the relic of his right arm. It is first mentioned in church history in 790 as the place of death and burial of the patriarch George of Beltan. The monastery became a centre of learning in the ninth century. Muslims were known to visit the monastery and the Islamic scholar Yaqut al-Hamawi recorded that he had heard that the monastery paid 10,000 dinars per annum to the Roman Emperor on behalf of Muslims who had made vows there.

In 969, at the invitation of the Roman Emperor Nikephoros II Phokas, a significant number of Syriac Orthodox Christians resettled Malatya and its hinterland, and the patriarch John VII Sarigta (r. 965–985) transferred his residence to the nearby Monastery of Bārid. Whilst John VII's successor Athanasius IV Salhoyo (r. 986/987–1002/1003) maintained the patriarchal residence at the Monastery of Bārid, he however died at the Mor Bar Sauma Monastery and was buried in the sacristy, which was located on the north side of the old church. Athanasius IV was thus succeeded by John VIII bar Abdoun, who had been a monk at the Mor Bar Sauma Monastery.

The persecution of Syriac Orthodox Christians in the eleventh century led most patriarchs to reside outside of Roman territory until the Seljuk victory at the Battle of Manzikert in 1071 weakened the Romans' grasp of the region and allowed the Mor Bar Sauma Monastery to become the focal point of the Church's activities. As a consequence, it produced several subsequent patriarchs, namely Basil II (r. 1074–1075), Dionysius V Lazarus (r. 1077–1078/1079), and Athanasius VI bar Khamoro (r. 1091–1129), who had all previously been monks there. As the patriarchal residence, the monastery's library became renowned, particularly due to the collections of Patriarch Athanasius VI.

=== During the Crusades ===
Malatya and the surrounding region was captured by the Danishmendid Emir Gazi Gümüshtigin in 1101, in which year the monastery's fortifications were strengthened to better protect it against potential threats due to its position on the frontier between Turkish territory to the north and Armenian and Frankish territory to the south. However, Joscelin I, Count of Edessa, was able to seize the chrism and ritual objects necessary for the consecration of a patriarch after the death of Athanasius VI in 1129, thereby securing control of the election of his successor, which were only returned to Athanasius VII bar Qatra (r. 1138/1139–1166) after having approved of Joscelin II's preferred candidate to become archbishop of Edessa.

The monastery was pillaged and burned by the Turks in the 1140s. Following the loss of Edessa and most of his county, Joscelin II ransacked the monastery in 1148 in the hope of restoring his fortunes with the treasures of the monastery and extorted 10,000 dinars from the monks and their tenants. A sum of 5000 dinars was then collected by the metropolitan bishop of Kaysum from Syriac Orthodox Christians to restore the monastery. In spite of this, a synod was held at the Mor Bar Sauma Monastery in January 1155 by Athanasius VII, at which the process of the preparation of the chrism was agreed and confirmed the merger of the dioceses of the Mor Mattai Monastery and of Tikrit.

Towards the middle of the 12th century, many Syriac Orthodox Christians took refuge in the principality of Antioch, driven by the fall of Edessa as well as the sack of the monastery. This spread the veneration of Mōr-Barṣawmō amongst the population of Antioch and resulted in the building of a church dedicated to the saint in 1156, sponsored by a Frankish couple, and a monk of the Mor Bar Sauma Monastery, Saliba, became its first prior. Ties between the monastery and the church in Antioch remained strong and many refugees from the region around the monastery attended the church.

In 1162–1163, an aqueduct was constructed at the monastery by Yuhanna, metropolitan bishop of Mardin, and its fortifications were bolstered in 1164. Upon the death of Athanasius VII in 1166, he was buried alongside Athanasius IV and Athanasius VI in the sacristy of the old church and succeeded by Michael the Syrian, archimandrite of the Mor Bar Sauma Monastery. From 1180 onwards, Michael's patriarchate was contested by the anti-patriarch Theodoros bar Wahbun (d. 1193), who was a former monk of the Mor Bar Sauma Monastery. Although it was seriously damaged by fire in 1183, Michael used the monastery to host several synods throughout his patriarchate and expanded the library's collection of manuscripts. In addition to this, he constructed the new church between 1180 and 1193, where he was later buried. Materials from the ancient ruins atop Mount Nemrut may have been used in the construction of the vaults of the new church in 1186. Michael's successor Athanasius VIII bar Salibi (r. 1199–1207), who had also been abbot of the Mor Bar Sauma Monastery, was challenged by the anti-patriarch Michael II the Younger, a former student at the monastery.

=== Decline and end ===
Use of the Mor Bar Sauma Monastery as a patriarchal residence declined in the 13th century as Ignatius III David (r. 1222–1252), a former monk of the monastery, largely resided in Armenian and Frankish territory at Qalʿa Rumoyto and Antioch. Dionysius VII ʿAngur (r. 1252–1261) resided at the monastery and was visited by the maphrian Bar Hebraeus at least twice. For a time, control of the monastery was contested between its abbot Yaʿqub and his brother the physician priest Shemʿun of Qalʿa Rumoyto and Patriarch Ignatius IV Yeshu (r. 1264–1282/1283) until the brothers recognised the patriarch's authority and submitted to him.

The monastery seemed to have served as the regular residence of Philoxenus I Nemrud (r. 1283–1292) despite suffering severe damage in an earthquake in 1284/1285 and was used for the consecration of Barṣawmo Ṣafī as maphrian in 1288. The monastery was likely abandoned soon after it had been looted by Kurds and the patriarchal claimant Ignatius Constantine had been murdered in 1293. The Mor Bar Sauma Monastery was later reoccupied in the second half of the fifteenth century. Hnania, bishop of the Mor Bar Sauma Monastery, is attested at the monastery in 1583 by Leonard Abel. It continued to operate until at least 1675/1676, at which point it is attested that a rabbān (priest-monk in Syriac) named Barṣawm was ordained for the monastery.

== Archaeology ==
The monastery was identified with the archaeological site known as Borsun Kalesi situated around a 1600m peak at the south-western end of the Kaplı Dağı in the upper valley of the Kâhta Çayı, between Malatya and Adıyaman in Turkey, by Ernst Honigmann. The remains of the monastery were examined in 2000 and 2004 and found to be in an alarming state as wild excavation and site destruction were threatening the site.

== Bibliography ==
- Badwii, Abdo; Baroudi, Fadi (25–27 June 2005). "The Monastery of Mar Barsaum" (PDF). Syriac Studies Symposium V Syriac as a Bridgle Culture.
- Barsoum, Aphrem (2003). The Scattered Pearls: A History of Syriac Literature and Sciences. Translated by Matti Moosa (2nd ed.). Gorgias Press.
- Barsoum, Aphrem (2008). History of the Za'faran Monastery. Translated by Matti Moosa. Gorgias Press.
- Barsoum, Aphrem (2009). The Collected Historical Essays of Aphram I Barsoum. Vol. 1. Translated by Matti Moosa. Gorgias Press.
- Chabot, Jean-Baptiste, ed. (1905). Chronique de Michel le Syrien (in French). Vol. III. Paris: Ernest Leroux.
- Bcheiry, Iskandar (2010). A List of Syriac Orthodox Ecclesiastic Ordinations from the Sixteenth and Seventeenth Century: The Syriac Manuscript of Hunt 444 (Syr 68 in Bodleian Library, Oxford). Gorgias Press.
- Fiey, Jean Maurice (1993). Pour un Oriens Christianus Novus: Répertoire des diocèses syriaques orientaux et occidentaux (in French).
- Harrak, Amir, ed. (2019). The Chronicle of Michael the Great (the Edessa-Aleppo Syriac codex): books XV-XXI from the year 1050 to 1195. Piscataway, NJ: Gorgias Press. ISBN 978-1-4632-4031-8.
- Hillenbrand, Carole (28 May 2020). Syria in Crusader Times: Conflict and Co-Existence. Edinburgh University Press. ISBN 978-1-4744-2973-3.
- Honigmann, Ernst; Faroqhi, Suraiya (1991). "Malatya". Encyclopaedia of Islam, Second Edition. Vol. 6. pp. 230–232.
- Ignatius Jacob III (2008). History of the Monastery of Saint Matthew in Mosul. Translated by Matti Moosa. Gorgias Press.
- Kaufhold, Hubert (2000). "Notizen zur Späten Geschichte des Barsaumo-Klosters". Hugoye: Journal of Syriac Studies. 3 (2).
- MacEvitt, Christopher (2010). The Crusades and the Christian World of the East: Rough Tolerance. University of Pennsylvania Press. ISBN 978-0812202694.
- Mazzola, Marianna (2018). Bar 'Ebroyo's Ecclesiastical History : writing Church History in the 13th century Middle East. Université Paris sciences et lettres; Universiteit Gent.
- Takahashi, Hidemi (2011). "Barṣawmo, Dayro d-Mor". In Sebastian P. Brock; Aaron M. Butts; George A. Kiraz; Lucas Van Rompay (eds.). Gorgias Encyclopedic Dictionary of the Syriac Heritage. Gorgias Press. pp. 60–61.
- Tannous, Jack (2020). The Making of the Medieval Middle East: Religion, Society, and Simple Believers. Princeton University Press.
- Vryonis, Speros (1971). The Decline of Medieval Hellenism in Asia Minor and the Process of Islamization from the Eleventh through the Fifteenth Century. University of California Press.
- Weltecke, Dorothea (2006). "On the Syriac Orthodox in the Principality of Antioch during the Crusader Period". In Ciggaar, Krijna Nelly; Metcalf, David Michael (eds.). East and West in the Medieval Eastern Mediterranean: Antioch from the Byzantine Reconquest Until the End of the Crusader Principality. Peeters Publishers. pp. 95–124. ISBN 978-90-429-1735-4.
