= Athanasius VI bar Khamoro =

76th Patriarch of Syriac Orthodox Church of Antioch (1091-1129)

- Syriac Orthodox Patriarch of Antioch and All the East
- Church: Syriac Orthodox Church
- Installed: 1091
- Term ended: 1129
- Predecessor: Dionysius VI
- Successor: John XI bar Mawdyono

Personal details
- Born: Abu al-Faraj Amid
- Died: 8 June 1129 Monastery of Mar Barsoum

Athanasius VI bar Khamoro was the Patriarch of Antioch, and head of the Syriac Orthodox Church from 1091 until his death in 1129.

== Biography ==
=== Origin ===
Abu al-Faraj was born in the 11th century in the city of Amid into the Camra family, and went on to become a monk at the Monastery of Mar Barsoum where he studied Syriac, Arabic and religious sciences under Dionysius Modyana. In March 1091, al-Faraj was elected as patriarch by the Holy Synod but humbly refused. Nine months later, the metropolitan bishops, with the assistance of Gabriel of Melitene, forced al-Faraj to become patriarch against his will and was consecrated Patriarch of Antioch in December 1091. Upon his consecration, al-Faraj took the name Athanasius. In c. 1096, Athanasius sought the support of Caliph Al-Mustazhir against 'Abdur, who claimed to be patriarch.

=== Dispute about the see of Edessa ===
Following the death of the archbishop of Edessa in 1101, the patriarch, like other medieval patriarchs of the Middle East, had no fixed see and thus planned to establish himself in the city. The Syriac Orthodox population of Edessa, however, requested to elect their own bishop, to which Athanasius agreed on the condition that gospel books that had belonged to a previous patriarch were returned. An agreement was reached and the patriarch ordained Abu Ghalib bar Sabuni as bishop of Edessa, assuming the name Basil, and was thereafter known as Basil II. However, a certain priest known as Abun had sold the copies and used the proceeds for bribes. Those who had bought the copies refused to return them and Bar Sabuni informed Athanasius of his predicament. Athanasius responded with the deposition of Bar Sabuni and ordination of a certain Ignatius as bishop of Edessa in December 1101. The conflict divided the Syriac Orthodox population of Edessa between supporters of the patriarch and supporters of the bishop, who continued to ordain priests and gained the support of Baldwin II, Count of Edessa.

Several crusader and Syriac Orthodox delegations were sent to petition Athanasius and gain a pardon for Bar Sabuni, to no avail. A delegation of Bishop Dionysius bar Modyana of Melitene and 70 Syriac Orthodox community leaders that met with Athanasius at the Monastery of Mar Barsoum was also unsuccessful, following which, Athanasius deposed Dionysius bar Modyana for supporting Bar Sabuni. Bar Sabuni sought the aid of Bernard of Valence, Latin Patriarch of Antioch, who invited Athanasius to Antioch to discuss the conflict. At the Cathedral of St Peter, during discussions between the parties, a translator misinterpreted Athanasius to suggest the conflict was based on money, leading Bernard to believe Athanasius practised simony, for which the patriarch and bishop were both beaten.

The crusaders allowed the patriarch to go to the Syriac Orthodox Church of the Mother of God in Antioch, but was forbidden from leaving the city until a solution to the conflict had been found. Athanasius bribed Roger of Salerno, regent of the Principality of Antioch, to allow him to leave the city and travel to the Monastery of Qanqart, southwest of Amid, and outside of crusader territory. The patriarch ordered the closure of the Syriac Orthodox cathedral of Edessa, exacerbating tensions and led to fights between the two factions. In 1112, Athanasius consecrated Mor Dionysius Mosa as maphrian. The patriarch is known to have excommunicated and deposed the bishop of Segestan.

=== Final years ===
A dispute between the Camra and the Qarya family of Qanqart over the ownership of certain properties arose. The Qarya family lodged a complaint against the patriarch with the governor of Amid, to which Athanasius responded with the excommunication of Deacon Isaac, a member of the family. The governor of Amid was angered by Athanasius' refusal to pardon the deacon and the patriarch was only able to leave the monastery with the aid of Joscelin I, who threatened to destroy the city of Amid if Athanasius was not permitted to leave. Athanasius travelled to Turbessel to thank Joscelin, after which he returned to the Monastery of Mar Barsoum. On 2 June 1129, the patriarch suffered a stroke during service and died 6 days later on 8 June at the Monastery of Mar Barsoum, where he is buried.

As patriarch, Athanasius was known for collecting precious books which he took with him with wherever he travelled. Athanasius was also criticised for his harsh treatment of his subordinates. During his reign as patriarch he ordained sixty-one metropolitans and bishops before his death.

== Bibliography ==
- Barsoum, Ignatius Aphrem I (2003). Matti Moosa, ed. The Scattered Pearls: The History of Syriac Literature and Sciences
- MacEvitt, Christopher (2010). The Crusades and the Christian World of the East: Rough Tolerance. University of Pennsylvania Press. ISBN 978-0812202694.
- Moosa, Matti (2008). "The Franks and the Syrian Christians". The Crusades: Conflict Between Christendom and Islam. Gorgias Press.

Preceded by Dionysius VI	Syrian Orthodox Patriarch of Antioch; 1091–1129	Succeeded by John XI bar Mawdyono
