= Pope Michael V of Alexandria =

Head of the Coptic Church from 1145 to 1146

- Pope of Alexandria and Patriarch of the See of St. Mark
- Papacy began: 29 July 1145
- Papacy ended: 29 March 1146
- Predecessor: Gabriel II
- Successor: John V

Personal details
- Born: Daqadus, Dakahlia Governorate, Egypt
- Died: 29 March 1146 Egypt
- Buried: Monastery of Saint Macarius the Great
- Denomination: Coptic Orthodox Christian
- Residence: The Hanging Church

Pope Michael V of Alexandria, or Mikha’il V, was the 71st Pope of Alexandria and Patriarch of the See of St. Mark from 1145 to 1146. During his papacy, he returned the relics of Saint Macarius of Egypt from village of Shabsheer to the Nitrian Desert on 19 Mesori. His papacy was during the Fatimid Caliphate.

He is commemorated in the Coptic Synaxarion on the 3rd day of Parmouti.

Religious titles
Preceded by Gabriel II	Coptic Pope; 1145–1146	Succeeded by John V
