= John XI bar Mawdyono =

77th Patriarch of Syriac Orthodox Church of Antioch

- Syriac Orthodox Patriarch of Antioch and All the East
- Church: Syriac Orthodox Church
- See: Antioch
- Installed: 1130
- Term ended: 1137
- Predecessor: Athanasius VI bar Khamoro
- Successor: Athanasius VII bar Qatra

Personal details
- Died: 1137

John XI bar Mawdyono, also known as Yuhanna Modyana, was the Patriarch of Antioch, and head of the Syriac Orthodox Church from 1130 until his death in 1137.

== Biography ==
Prior to his ascension as patriarch, John was abbot of the Monastery of Dovair, near Antioch. Following the death of Patriarch Athanasius VI bar Khamoro in June 1129, Joscelin I seized the ritual objects needed to consecrate a new patriarch from the Monastery of Mor Bar Sauma and directed bishops within his domain to assemble a synod to elect a new patriarch. A synod largely composed of bishops from territories ruled by the crusaders and Armenians, as opposed to Muslim-controlled territories, headed by Bishop Dionysius of Kesum was held and John was elected patriarch.

John travelled to Turbessel, the capital of the County of Edessa, where he was consecrated as patriarch in the Latin church on 17 February 1130, with Joscelin I in attendance. John pardoned Abu Ghalib bar Sabuni, former Bishop of Edessa, and the former bishop of Segestan, both of whom had been deposed by Athanasius VI. The former bishop of Segestan was offered the dioceses of Samosata and Samha, but the local Syriac Orthodox population rejected him and he subsequently joined the Knights Templar. John resided at Kaysun, a town within the County of Edessa, and ordained three bishops. John administered the Syriac Orthodox Church prior to his death in 1137.

== Bibliography ==
- Moosa, Matti (2008). "The Franks and the Syrian Christians". The Crusades: Conflict Between Christendom and Islam. Gorgias Press. Archived from the original on 2017-03-28.
- MacEvitt, Christopher (2010). The Crusades and the Christian World of the East: Rough Tolerance. University of Pennsylvania Press. ISBN 978-0812202694.

Preceded by Athanasius VI bar Khamoro	Syrian Orthodox Patriarch of Antioch; 1130–1137	Succeeded by Athanasius VII bar Qatra
