= John VIII bar Abdoun =

67th Patriarch of Syriac Orthodox Church of Antioch

- Syriac Orthodox Patriarch of Antioch and All the East
- Church: Syriac Orthodox Church
- Installed: 6 July 1004
- Term ended: 2 February 1033
- Predecessor: Athanasius IV Salhoyo
- Successor: Dionysius IV Yahya

Personal details
- Born: 944 Melitene, Abbasid Caliphate (modern-day Malatya, Turkey)
- Died: 2 February 1033 (aged 88 or 89) Monastery of Ganos, Byzantine Empire

John VIII bar Abdoun was the Patriarch of Antioch, and head of the Syriac Orthodox Church from 1004 until his death in 1033.

== Biography ==
Bar Abdoun was born in 944 in the city of Melitene and studied at the nearby Mor Bar Sauma Monastery. He was consecrated Patriarch of Antioch on 6 July 1004. During the reign of the Roman Emperor Basil II, Bar Abdoun allegedly cured the doux (governor) of Antioch of leprosy, and enjoyed good relations with the Greek Orthodox Patriarch of Antioch. John is known to have met with the Greek Orthodox patriarch, corresponded with him, and exchanged gifts on a feast-day.

Following the reconquest, and subsequent expulsion of the Muslim population of Melitene in the early 10th century AD, the Romans invited Syriac Orthodox adherents to repopulate of the city of Melitene and its hinterland, however, the doctrinal differences between the Syriac Orthodox and Greek Orthodox created conflict. The conduct of Bar Abdoun led John, Bishop of Melitene, to denounce him to Alexius Studites, Patriarch of Constantinople, and Constantine VIII, the successor of Basil II, not long before his death in 1028.

In 1029, John of Melitene repeated his condemnations to Romanos III, Constantine's successor, who subsequently sent word to John Chrysoberges, the krites (civil governor) of Melitene, to arrest Bar Abdoun and other Syriac Orthodox clergymen. Chrysoberges attempted to convince Bar Abdoun to flee to Muslim territory. Failing that, Chrysoberges reluctantly arrested Bar Abdoun, six high-ranking bishops, and 20 monks, and sent them to Constantinople to be judged before a synodal tribunal. The Greek Orthodox Patriarch of Antioch did not attend the tribunal in protest of the actions of his coreligionists. The Romans unsuccessfully attempted to persuade the majority of the clergymen to abandon the Syriac Orthodox Church, and, as a result, in October 1029, Bar Abdoun and the others were excommunicated and banished to the Monastery of Ganos in Thrace.

According to the edict of Alexius, issued in May 1030, three Syriac Orthodox bishops that accompanied Bar Abdoun converted to Greek Orthodoxy to avoid exile. The edict was issued against the Syriac Orthodox population of Melitene, but lacked the support of the Greek Orthodox Patriarch of Antioch, and another edict was issued in 1032, with the support of the new Greek Orthodox patriarch. During Bar Abdoun's exile, the Syriac Orthodox population of the Roman Empire suffered persecution as the authorities attempted to destroy sacred books at Antioch and profaned the cross and Eucharist at the Syriac Orthodox church in Constantinople. Bar Abdoun remained in exile at the Monastery of Ganos until his death on 2 February 1033.

== Bibliography ==
- Ahrweiler, Hélène; Laiou, Angeliki E. (1998). Studies on the Internal Diaspora of the Byzantine Empire. Dumbarton Oaks. ISBN 9780884022473.
- Bataille, André (1955). Traité d'études byzantines. Presses universitaires de France.
- Chitwood, Zachary (2017). Byzantine Legal Culture and the Roman Legal Tradition, 867–1056. Cambridge University Press. ISBN 9781316864500.
- Ciggaar, Krijna Nelly; Metcalf, David Michael (2006). East and West in the Medieval Eastern Mediterranean: Antioch from the Byzantine reconquest until the end of the Crusader principality. Peeters Publishers. ISBN 9789042917354.
- Eastmond, Antony (2017). Eastern Approaches to Byzantium. Routledge. ISBN 9781351942133.
- Hussey, Joan Mervyn (2010). The Orthodox Church in the Byzantine Empire. Oxford University Press. ISBN 9780199582761.
- Johnson, Dale Albert (2016). Return to Antioch. ISBN 9781365053009.
- Mayeur, Jean-Marie; Dagron, Gilbert; Riché, Pierre; Hannick, Christian; Vauchez, André (1993). Evêques, moines et empereurs: 610-1054. Desclée. ISBN 9782718906140.

Preceded by Athanasius IV Salhoyo	Syriac Orthodox Patriarch of Antioch; 1004–1033	Succeeded by Dionysius IV Yahya
