= Athanasius VII bar Qatra =

78th Patriarch of Syriac Orthodox Church of Antioch

- Syriac Orthodox Patriarch of Antioch and All the East
- Church: Syriac Orthodox Church
- See: Antioch
- Installed: 1139
- Term ended: 1166
- Predecessor: John XI bar Mawdyono
- Successor: Michael I Rabo

Personal details
- Born: Yeshu bar Qatra

Athanasius VII bar Qatra was the Patriarch of Antioch, and head of the Syriac Orthodox Church from 1139 until his death in 1166.

== Biography ==
In 1139, a synod of twelve bishops elected and ordained Deacon Yeshu bar Qatra as patriarch in the city of Amid, facing pressure from the city's Muslim ruler, upon which he assumed the name Athanasius. A faction within the church, including the bishop of Jihan, claimed the ordination went against church canons and slandered Athanasius to Joscelin II, Count of Edessa. Members of the faction suggested that Joscelin should hold another synod to elect a new patriarch according to the canons of the Syriac Orthodox Church. The count summoned Timothy, Bishop of Gargar, a city within his domain, to Samosata for his counsel, to which Timothy lent his support to Athanasius. However, Joscelin forbade the proclamation of Athanasius as patriarch throughout the County of Edessa as he had not paid homage to the count.

Athanasius subsequently travelled from the city of Melitene to the neighbouring Monastery of Mor Bar Sauma. Joscelin II continued to interfere in church affairs as he proclaimed Basilius Bar Shumanna, Bishop of Kesum, as bishop of Edessa. The patriarch confirmed Bar Shumanna as Bishop of Edessa and in his place ordained Iliyya as bishop of Kesum, who assumed the name John. In return, John received the ritual objects needed to consecrate a new patriarch that Joscelin had seized from the Monastery of Mor Barsoum in 1129. Athanasius met and reconciled with Joscelin II, and bishops who opposed him, at Turbessel, the capital of the County of Edessa in early 1144, following Joscelin's return from the coronation of Baldwin III in Jerusalem in December 1143. Basilius Bar Shumanna and Athanasius later met at Amid and was ordained as bishop of Sebaberk, a diocese within the archdiocese of Edessa, as he had been deprived of his see following the fall of Edessa in December 1144.

During Athanasius' tenure as patriarch, the Monastery of Mor Barsoum was ransacked on 18 June 1148 by Joscelin II, who, seriously lacking in funds, stole the Hand of Mor Barsoum, the monastery's most prized possession, and took fifty monks as prisoners. The monks were later allowed to return to the monastery after their 10,000 dinar ransom had been paid in August 1148, and the relic was returned at the additional cost of 5000 dinars in December 1150. On 9 December 1157, Athanasius, alongside Baldwin III, King of Jerusalem, Aimery of Limoges, Latin Patriarch of Antioch, Thoros II, Lord of Cilicia, Michael Rabo, abbot of the Monastery of Mor Barsoum and future successor to Athanasius, and others, attended the consecration of a new church in Antioch. The patriarch continued to administer the Syriac Orthodox Church prior to his death in 1166.

== Bibliography ==
- MacEvitt, Christopher (2010). The Crusades and the Christian World of the East: Rough Tolerance. University of Pennsylvania Press. ISBN 978-0812202694.
- Moosa, Matti (2003). "A Sketch of Syriac Sources on the Crusades". The Crusades: Other Experiences, Alternate Perspectives. Global Academic Publishing. ISBN 9781586842512.
- Moosa, Matti (2008). "The Franks and the Syrian Christians". The Crusades: Conflict Between Christendom and Islam. Gorgias Press. Archived from the original on 2017-03-28.

Preceded by John XI bar Mawdyono	Syrian Orthodox Patriarch of Antioch; 1139–1166	Succeeded by Michael I Rabo
