= Michael the Syrian =

79th patriarch and 12th-century saint & chronicler of the Syriac Orthodox Church

His Holiness (Moran Mor) Michael the Syrian ܡܝܟܐܝܠ ܣܘܪܝܝܐ Patriarch of Antioch and All the East
- 79th Patriarch of the Syriac Orthodox Church
- A portrait and icon of Michael the Great
- Native name: ܡܝܟܐܝܠ Mikhoēl
- Church: Syriac Orthodox Church
- See: Antioch
- In office: 1166–1199
- Predecessor: Athanasius VII bar Qatra
- Successor: Athanasius VIII

Orders
- Ordination: 18 October 1166

Personal details
- Born: 1126 Melitene, Danishmend Kingdom (modern-day Malatya, Turkey)
- Died: 1199 (aged 72–73)
- Buried: Mor Bar Sauma Monastery

Michael the Syrian, also known as Michael the Great (Syriac: ܡܝܟܐܝܠ ܪܒܐ, romanized: Mīkā'ēl Rābā; 1126 – 7 November 1199), was the Syriac Orthodox Patriarch of Antioch from 1166 until his death in 1199. He is widely regarded as one of the most important figures in the history of the Syriac Orthodox Church, remembered both as a saint and as a historian.

Hailing from the distinguished Qindisi family of Melitene, he quickly rose through the ranks to become Patriarch of Antioch. His tenure as patriarch at the Mor Hananyo Monastery involved maintaining good political and ecumenical relations with Crusaders, expressing disdain for Byzantines, and protecting his flock from Arab and Turkic incursions while navigating various church politics, including a schism in the patriarchate by Theodoros bar Wahbun.

His monumental Chronicle is the largest surviving historical work in Syriac literature, covering world history from Creation up to his own day. The chronicle, mainly preserved in an Edessan manuscript as a copy of a copy, records ecclesiastical affairs, natural phenomena, secular history, and other pertinent matters. Modern scholars call it "undoubtedly the greatest of all Syriac chronicles" and a cornerstone of medieval historiography, in addition to dozens of other works by Michael which catalyzed the era of "Syriac Renaissance."

Michael, described as "one of the greatest pontiffs [...] finest of the Patriarchs [...] of everlasting name, of graceful pursuit, and of uncommon qualities," is highly venerated in the Oriental Orthodox Communion and his feast day in the Syriac Orthodox Church is on November 7, the date of his repose.

== Life ==
The life of Michael is recorded by Bar Hebraeus. Michael was born in Melitene (modern Malatya, Turkey) into a Syriac Orthodox priestly family in 1126. His father, Reverend Eliya al-Qindasi (Elias Qîndîsî), was a priest, and his uncle Athanasius Zakkai (or Zakka) was a monk who later became bishop of Anazarbus in Cilicia in 1136. He thus belonged to the distinguished Qindasi family. At the time of his birth, Melitene was part of the Turkoman Danishmend dynasty, and after its division in 1142, it became the capital of a principality. In 1178, the city came under the control of the Sultanate of Rûm.

As a youth, Michael joined the Monastery of Mar Barsauma near Melitene, which had served as the patriarchal seat of the Syriac Orthodox Church since the 11th century. After completing his theological studies, he was ordained as a monk. Before reaching the age of thirty, he was appointed archimandrite (abbot) of the monastery, a position he held for nearly a decade. During this tenure, Michael enlarged the monastery's library, added new buildings, and rebuilt the water supply system, ensuring that it could accommodate the thousands of pilgrims who gathered annually for the feast of Saint Barsauma. He also took measures to improve the monastery's defenses against marauding bandits.

Michael soon gained a reputation as both a historian and theologian. In 1165, Patriarch Athanasius VII (1139–1166) sought to ordain him bishop of Amid (modern Diyarbakir), but Michael declined in order to devote himself to study. Following the patriarch's death in 1166, the Holy Synod met at Dayr Fesqin (or Peshqîn) near Melitene to elect his successor. After much debate, Michael was proposed as one of three candidates. Though initially reluctant, he accepted on the condition that the synod agree to enforce certain canons aimed at strengthening the church in its time of turmoil. Dionysios Jacob bar Salibi, bishop of Marash and Mabbug, preached in his favor, and Michael was unanimously elected and consecrated Patriarch of Antioch on 18 October 1166, in the presence of 28 bishops.

=== Patriarchate ===
Michael was the first Syriac Orthodox patriarch to act within the city of Antioch itself since the expulsion of Severus of Antioch by Justinian in the 6th century, and he consecrated a number of bishops there. He established his primary patriarchal residence at the Monastery of Deyruelzafaran in Mardin, while also spending significant time at Mar Barsauma. Immediately after his election, he contacted Pope John I of Alexandria (Yohanna ibn Abi Ghalib), in keeping with the traditional bonds between the Syriac and Coptic patriarchates. Michael also traveled extensively through the Levant. In 1168 he made a pilgrimage to Jerusalem, staying at the Monastery of Mary Magdalene near the Damascus Gate (Bāb al-'Amūd), and subsequently resided for a year at Antioch, which was under Crusader rule. In Antioch and Jerusalem, he was received with great respect by the Latin patriarchs and nobility, cultivating cordial relations with figures such as Amaury de Nesle, the Latin patriarch of Jerusalem.

Michael was invited in 1178 to attend the Third Lateran Council in Rome by Pope Alexander III but he declined, though he sent a theological treatise in his stead. He likewise refused overtures from Byzantine Emperor Manuel I Komnenos, who attempted to negotiate ecclesiastical union. On three occasions (1170, 1172, and thereafter), Michael declined to travel to Constantinople or meet imperial envoys, instead sending representatives and responding with clear affirmations of the Syriac Orthodox Miaphysite faith.

As patriarch, Michael appointed twenty-five bishops, reformed lax clerical practices, and combated simony. His reforms provoked opposition, and he faced several rebellions from bishops and clergy. In 1171 and again in 1176, monks of Mar Barsauma rebelled against him. In 1174, he deposed Yuhanna al-Qaluniqi, bishop of Mardin, who retaliated by agitating the emir of Mosul and ruler of Mardin against Michael. Further opposition came from Bar Masih and culminated in the consecration of Theodore bar Wahbun as antipatriarch in Cilicia around 1180. Supported by discontented clergy, the Armenian king, the Catholicos of Armenia, and even at times the Crusaders — all of whom claimed jurisdictions over the Syrians of Cilicia — Theodore appealed in vain to Saladin for recognition. Michael excommunicated him, and after his escape from imprisonment at Mar Barsauma, Theodore sought refuge with the Armenian catholicos Gregory IV and Prince Leo II of Cilician Armenia, who officially recognized him. The schism persisted for 13 years until Theodore's death in 1193, when the Syriac Orthodox synod reaffirmed loyalty to Michael.

Despite these challenges, Michael maintained wide prestige. He cultivated diplomatic relations with Muslim and Christian rulers alike, including Sultan Kilij Arslan II of Rûm, whom he met cordially at Melitene in 1182. He supported Pope Mark III of Alexandria in the excommunication of Mark ibn Kunbar during the Egyptian controversy on confession. In his Chronicle, Michael lamented the suffering of Middle Eastern Christians under Latin occupation, particularly in Jerusalem.

Late in his life, amidst the controversies with Theodore bar Wahbun and the burdens of office, Michael attempted to resign in 1193, but the synod refused his abdication. He continued his patriarchate until his death on 7 November 1199 at the Monastery of Mar Barsauma, aged 72, having served 33 years as patriarch, and was buried in a tomb he had constructed in advance, located north of the altar of the monastery's church. During his patriarchate, Michael ordained one Maphrian and 54 bishops. His successor was Athanasius IX (1199–1207), also abbot of Mar Barsauma; a rival claimant, Michael II the Younger, contested him and later became antipatriarch instead of Athanasius and later John XIV.

== Chronicle ==
=== Composition and structure ===
Michael is best known for the world chronicle that he composed, the longest and richest surviving chronicle in the Syriac language. The Chronicle is the most extensive historical work of Syriac literature ever written, comprising 21 books from the Creation of the world to his era in 1194. It was composed in a unique three-column format: the first column for secular and political history, the second for ecclesiastical affairs, and the third for natural phenomena such as earthquakes, locust swarms, and celestial events. Between chapters, Michael inserted chronological tables that synchronized different systems of dating — the Seleucid era, the Nativity, Olympiads, and the Hijra (used exclusively in reference to Muslim caliphs). A small miscalculation in aligning Seleucid and Nativity dates runs throughout the work. This method built upon the tables of Eusebius of Caesarea, was expanded by Jacob of Edessa, and later developed by Michael himself.

This new format of separate columns outlining different historical sections was used by earlier by Syriac Orthodox hierarchs such as John of Ephesus, Jacob of Edessa, and Dionysius of Tell-Mahre, and later by Bar Hebraeus. It was reserved for senior hierarchs which emphasized the important mission that accompanied it.

Michael occasionally devoted all three columns to a single subject when greater detail was needed. After the chronicle ends abruptly, it is followed by six appendices. The first appendix summarizes the kings and patriarchs cited in the text. The second appendix is a treatise on the historical identity of the Syrians, associating them with ancient Near Eastern empires which are the Assyrians, Babylonians, and Arameans. When the chronicle was translated into Armenian twice in 1246 and 1247, some aspects were changed to accommodate Armenian interests.

=== Manuscripts and translations ===
The autograph of Michael the Great's Chronicle is lost. What survives is a much later copy of a copy: it was transcribed in 1598 by Bishop Michael of Urbish, four centuries after the author's death and was itself based on an earlier copy produced by Moses of Mardin. The scribe preserved Michael's style, while correcting errors in the margins — sometimes with remarks such as "This was in the year 1909 of the perfidious and corrupt Greeks," echoing Michael's own hostility toward Byzantine persecutions against the Jacobites. The surviving codex, written in elegant script on roughly 800 large folios, was preserved in the library of Edessa, though 19 folios are missing. This Edessene manuscript remained in Urfa until 1924, when the city's Christian population was expelled in the aftermath of Sayfo; it was then moved to the Syriac Orthodox church of St. George in Aleppo. The Hill Museum and Manuscript Library digitized it in 2008.

==== Syriac manuscript tradition ====
The 1598 Urbish copy remains the only extant Syriac witness of the text, written in Serto script, although other transcriptions based on it exist. The manuscript was discovered in Edessa and subsequently copied for modern scholars. One such copy was made for the Syriac Catholic Patriarch Ignatius Ephrem Rahmani in 1887, and another for the French orientalist Jean-Baptiste Chabot in 1899 (a digital facsimile is available at vHMML Reading Room). The Vorlage for these later copies is preserved today by the Edessene community in Aleppo. The text has lacunae, corresponding exactly to the gaps in the Arabic versions made from it. Despite these defects, the 1598 codex is regarded as the best surviving witness to the Chronicle's original layout and presentation.

==== Armenian translations ====
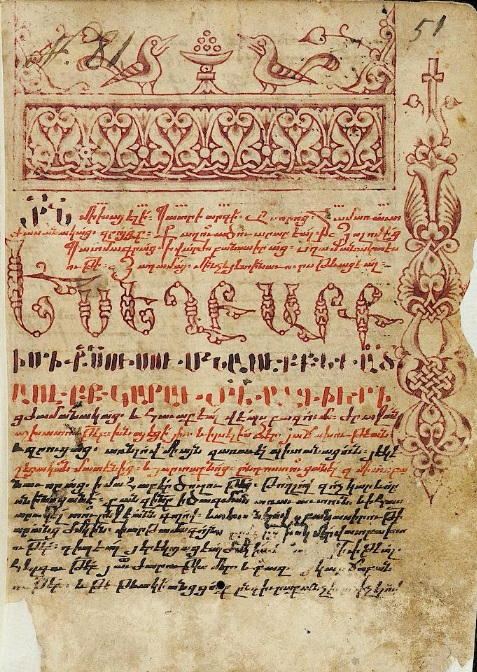
A 13th century Armenian translation of the Chronicle, manuscript of 1432

An abridged Armenian translation was produced in 1248 by the Assyrian priest Yeshu' (Ishoʿ) ibn Shammas Yaʿqub al‑Tume al‑Sharqi, a native of Hisn Kifa, at the request of Catholicos Constantine I of Cilicia. The work was not a literal translation but a condensed adaptation, often altering the material considerably. It was later revised by the Armenian monk Vardan. Two Jerusalem editions appeared in 1870 and 1871, with the latter considered more reliable.

This Armenian version was the first form of Michael's Chronicle to reach Europe. It served as the basis for the French translation published in 1868 by Victor Langlois, who mistakenly assumed it was a complete rendering of the Syriac original.

==== Arabic/Garshuni translations ====
The Chronicle was also translated into Garshuni (Arabic in Syriac script) by John Shuqayr (Hanna al-Sadadi), metropolitan of Damascus, in 1759. At least five manuscripts of this translation survive. However, since Shuqayr worked directly from the 1598 Urbish copy, the Arabic version preserves the same lacunae as the Syriac Vorlage.

Other Arabic renderings exist, including a more recent translation provided by the late Archbishop Saliba Shamoun (1932–2025) and edited by Gregorios Yohanna Ibrahim.

==== Western scholarship and editions ====
Knowledge of Michael's Chronicle in Europe began only in the 18th century, and even then it was largely ignored — Joseph Assemani did not reference it despite his access to Syriac sources. The Armenian adaptation initially misled scholars, as it was thought to represent a faithful translation. Serious study began only in the mid-19th century, when manuscripts of the Armenian text reached Europe.

In 1899–1910, J. B. Chabot published a French translation in four volumes (Chronique de Michel le Syrien, Patriarche Jacobite d'Antioche, 1166–1199), based on the Syriac manuscript in Edessa. His work included a facsimile edition of the Syriac text prepared between 1897 and 1899 in Aleppo, though some scribal errors were introduced in the copying process.

In 2014, Matti Moosa published the first complete English translation of the Chronicle, titled The Syriac Chronicle of Michael Rabo (the Great).

=== Content and themes ===
==== Secular and political affairs ====
The first column of the Chronicle records wars and conflicts among Arabs (whom Michael always calls Ṭāyyōyê, in reference to Tayy), Turks, Byzantines, Latins (Crusaders), and Armenians.

Michael paid particular attention to the Crusaders. He devoted long passages to the Knights Templar, praising their asceticism, obedience, fraternity, and generosity in famine relief. While theological divisions remained, he considered the Latins more favorable allies than Greeks, who consistently persecuted the Syriac Orthodox (see Caesaropapism).

Michael describes the devastating sieges of Edessa in the 12th century, whose population suffered the most at the hands of successive invaders. Caught between Franks, Greeks, Turks, Arabs, and their internal conflicts, Edessa was besieged repeatedly, each time producing severe persecution of its defenseless citizens: death, torture, imprisonment, humiliation, starvation, slavery, and rape. Many structures were dismantled for building material or repurposed — for example, the Church of St. Thomas was used as a stable. Michael places great blame on the Franks, whom he sometimes preferred to Turks or Greeks, who routinely pillaged the city and subjugated its native Miaphysite population; even when their victory was hoped for during the Turkish occupation, he calls them "brainless fools" for plundering shops and houses instead of attacking the Turkish soldiers in the citadel, which contributed to their defeat. After this disaster, Edessa fell into moral and spiritual decline, with Christians reduced to a minority as mosques multiplied.

After the disaster of 1146, the city declined morally and its native Syrian inhabitants were spiritually broken. Christians became a minority while the Muslim population grew and more mosques were built. Edessa was later absorbed by the Ayyubids, the Mongol conquests of Tatars and Hulaguids, and finally the Ottoman Empire, and its Christian population was largely eliminated during the persecutions that culminated in the early 20th century. By 1908, Christians constituted only about 19% of the population; on the eve of the mass exodus in 1924, the Syriac Orthodox numbered roughly 2,500. There are no Christians remaining in Şanlıurfa today.

==== Ecclesiastical affairs ====
The second column focuses on the church, particularly in ecclesiastical matters, which make up a large section — this was due to how at the time, the Syriac Orthodox Church extended across the Levant, Mesopotamia, Arabia, Iran, India, and China, and was governed by mutually antagonistic factions. Here, Michael recorded relations with neighboring communities. He chastised the "Synodites" (Chalcedonians/Byzantines) for their persecutions, claiming they devoted more energy to oppressing the Syriac people than resisting Turks. In contrast, relations with the Coptic Church were warm, and regular correspondence between patriarchs was reported.

Michael's theology portrays Christianity as independent of territory or temporal power. Like earlier Syriac chroniclers, a comparison is made to ancient Mesopotamian beliefs, where he interprets successes and failures in history as signs of divine favor or abandonment.

==== Natural phenomena ====
The third column registers natural events: earthquakes across Antioch, Damascus, and Constantinople; locusts; and comets, which Michael called kawkbō šūšīnō ("curly star"), preserving Syriac terminology over Greek loanwords. He rebukes astrologers for their attempts to predict events, including times when they failed to do so, affirming instead that disasters came from divine judgment, not planetary influence.

Michael's mastery of Syriac is noted as advanced and traditional, though he also read and spoke Arabic, and commended other bishops for their knowledge. His Chronicle includes occasional Arabisms in colloquial dialect, as well as Syriacized borrowings from Greek, Armenian, and Latin.

==== Historiography and sources ====
While he rarely mentions sources for some periods — likely drawing on memory and oral traditions — he does name a few: 1. Jacob of Edessa, Michael's main source for the pre-7th century; 2. Dionysius of Tell-Mahre, whose chronicle no longer survives; 3. Basil Bar‑Shumono, whom Michael quoted on early Edessan history; 4. Dionysius bar Salibi, whom Michael called an exceptional writer; 5. Patriarch John bar Shushan, whom Michael does not quote directly but reports his work; 6. Joseph the Monk, whom Michael quoted for the invasion of Miletus in 1050 AD; 7. Ignatius bishop of Melitene, whom Michael quotes at length regarding the Syriac Orthodox faith before the Chalcedonian patriarch of Constantinople; and 8. Evenaius of Keshum, whom Michael refutes for claiming that temptation strikes the righteous without the will of God, thereby undermining divine providence. He also quoted lost works, such as the Chronicle of Azakh, letters, synodal acts, and local biographies. Greek historians, ecclesiastical pamphlets, and unnamed Arabic sources were also used.

Michael freely inserted biblical parallels into his historical narrative, a tendency scholars term "presentism." He likened the Syriac Orthodox to the Israelites, the Nestorians to Judas, and the Seljuks to Jezebel. Turks were cast as Gog and Magog, while Kilij Arslan, Sultan of Iconium, was seen as fulfilling the prophecy in Jeremiah 17:5. Biblical portents were linked to earthquakes, eclipses, or comets, read as divine warnings preceding invasions.

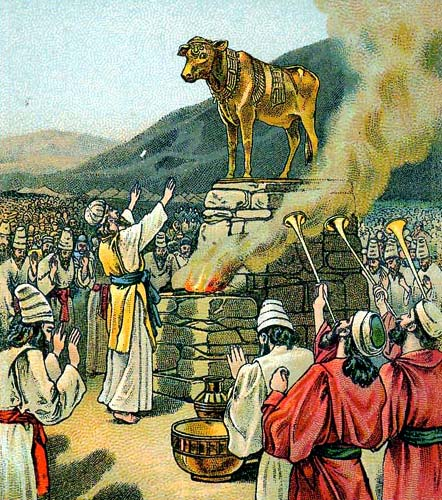
Michael compares the Chalcedonians to Exodus 32:1-35, where the Israelites forsook worshipping YHWH in favor of a golden calf

Michael attempts to console the believers by drawing on biblical events from the Old Testament. The events of the Council of Chalcedon are compared to the events of Exodus 32, and to the three who remained faithful in Persia when all the captives of Judah worshipped the statue; Michael applies this to the multitude at Chalcedon, calling them the synod of the apostates. He also cites "one who does the will [of God] is better than one thousand" (Eccl. 16:3). A recurring emphasis is that the saved are always a minority, and that the Church's size or prestige does not matter so long as it upholds true doctrine.

His historical outlook emphasized that punishment follows sin, but calamities can be alleviated through repentance. He cited the plague of 745, which abated only when the Arab caliph Marwan II repented.

The general view that developed in Syriac historiography is that disasters are caused by sin and are sent to punish sin and to teach people not to sin, but that disasters can also be relieved or averted by repentance and eventually by the intervention of the Church and its relics. This included the belief that God sends warning signs of impending disaster for those who have the sense to understand them. Since the schism caused by the Council of Chalcedon, God has sent portents involving the sun, earthquakes, and tearful signs in the sky that were taken to indicate the wickedness of the heretics and what would come upon the earth. But the warnings were not heeded, so God sent the barbarians.

Michael refers to numerous examples in which strange phenomena were taken to be divine messages. In the mid-fifth century, the fall of three stones from the sky was regarded by many as a sign of corruption in the churches, the dislodgment of the Orthodox faith, and the advance of Dyophysite doctrine, while a darkness similar to an eclipse observed at the consecration of Marcian was signified as a sign marking his reign of spiritual blindness and uproar. When Justin I started his reign, a fiery comet shaped like a spear pointing downward was interpreted as a sign of apostasy and the destruction of the Church. When a similar streak fire shaped like a sword stretched across the sky from south to north for thirty days in 634, many took it to be a sign of the advance of the Arabs. Later, in 745, three pillars of fire were witnessed by contemporaries in the heavens, and in the following year heavy dust darkened the sky for weeks alongside meteors in January and a flame towering in the same direction. All these signs were seen as omens of war, bloodshed, disasters and divine chastisement.

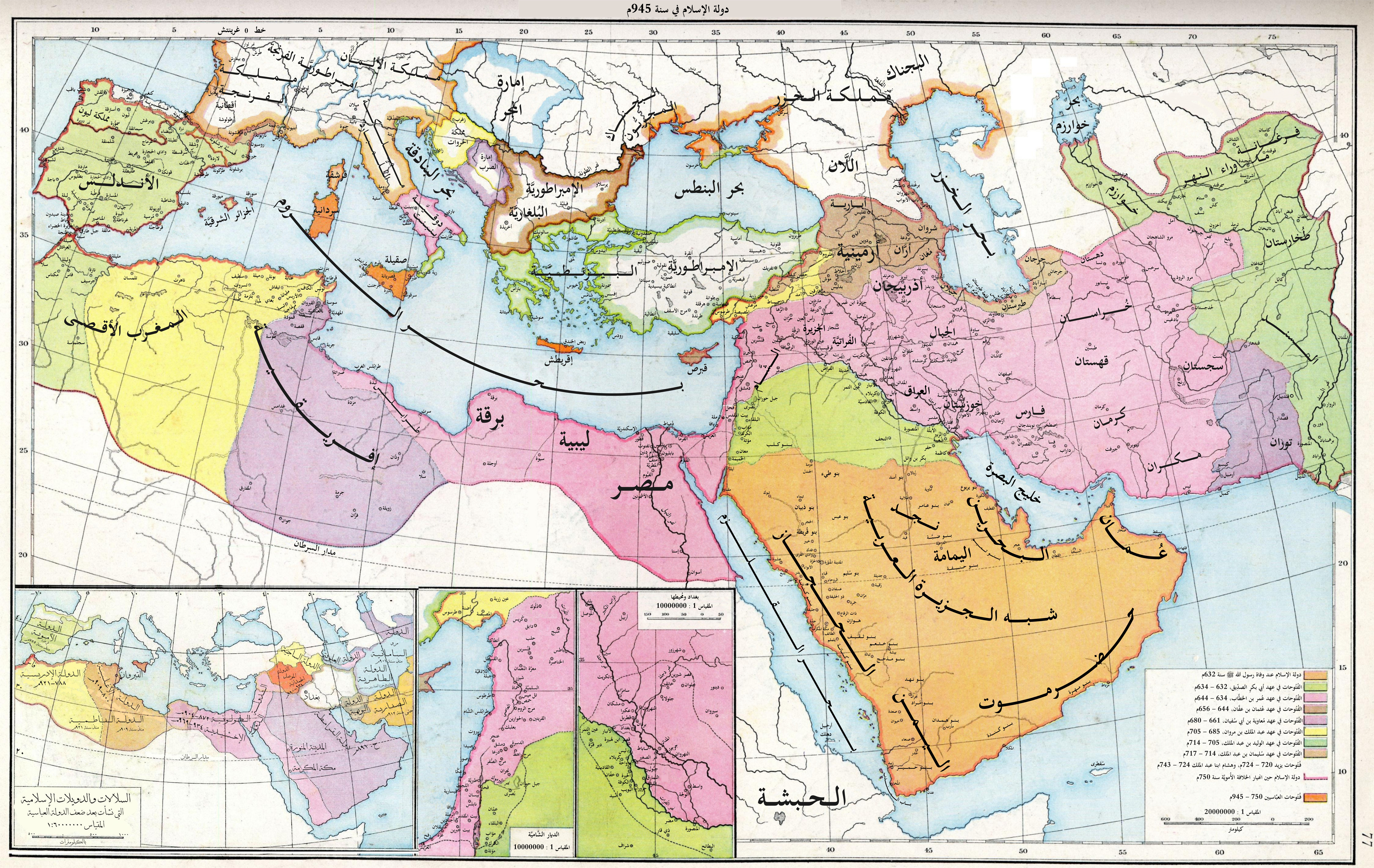
Michael was situated amid various invasions by multiple groups vying for power in his homeland, during one of the most geopolitically complex periods of the medieval era

He criticized Byzantine rulers like Heraclius for mutilating Syriac Orthodox dissenters. Heraclius ordered the noses and ears cut off and houses looted for anyone who did not support the Council of Chalcedon. This persecution persisted for an extended period, and many monks — particularly those from Beit Maron, Mabbugh, Hims, and the southern regions — supported the council and seized control of numerous churches and monasteries. Michael reports that Christians are unfit to govern other Christians, and despite persecution in the Sassanid regions, he regarded it as preferable to Roman rule, which he portrays as intent on destroying both the Syriac Orthodox Church and the Church of the East by continuously slaughtering the Syriac Christians. He further asserts that the Islamic conquests functioned simultaneously as punishment for the Chalcedonians and as a providential rescue for the Miaphysites, who, he argues, would not have survived without them — despite the severe hardships the church later suffered under Muslim rule. Michael also recounts that the Orthodox bishop Epiphanius fled the Arab conquest of Syria only to be killed as a martyr by the Roman general Gregorius in Cilicia. He adds that when the Romans withdrew from Syria, they robbed, pillaged, and devastated the country more than the Arabs, treating it as if it belonged to an enemy. Michael then remarks, "if the Arabs did not keep their promises, neither did the Romans — and not only toward the Arabs but among themselves."

==== Identity and geography ====
Michael's Chronicle articulates both confessional and ethnic identities. Above all, he defined the mhaymne ("faithful"), meaning Syriac Orthodox believers — whether Syriac- or Arabic-speaking (in Mosul and Tikrit) — as his people, in addition to the Copts, Armenians, and others who belonged to the same Miaphysite/non-Chalcedonian faith as him.

Yet because of the geopolitical circumstances of his era, he felt it necessary to define his people and faith in more nationalistic and secular terms; accordingly, he consistently connected them to the ancient empires of Assyria and Babylonia, identifying their kings as his own ancestors. He used names like "Assyria" (Ātōr), "Nineveh," and "Babylonia" for regions of Mesopotamia, explicitly as ancestral lands rather than mere biblical allusions.

The Melkites (Aramaic-speaking Syrians who followed the Council of Chalcedon after imperial crackdown) were disparagingly labeled "Greeks" rather than Syrians. Both Byzantine and Muslim critics mocked the Syriac Christians for "never producing kingdoms," to which Michael countered by citing Assyria and Babylonia as their sovereign ancestors.

Attributed to Jacob of Edessa (d. 708), transmitted via Dionysius of Tell-Mahre (d. 945), and later adopted by Michael, the Syriac account reframes ancient history to claim powerful "Syrian" kingdoms east and west of the Euphrates. Michael emphasized the historical significance of the "Syrian" kingdoms that existed on both sides of the Euphrates, using this narrative to assert his people's historical sovereignty despite lacking contemporary kings. He portrayed the Seleucids as local Syrian kings, viewing them as restorers of native royalty after Alexander's conquest of Persia. Despite Alexander being Greek, he was considered native, contributing to a hybrid Syrian identity characterized by Aramaic language and Greek cultural influences. Michael harmonizes various arguments by linking Syrian history with Aramean and Assyrian histories, citing them as forbearers of the Syriac tradition due to their shared Aramaic language.

==== Significance ====
Until the rediscovery of the Chronicle, Michael the Great was primarily known in the West as an author of canonical and liturgical writings. The publication of his universal history dramatically shifted scholarly appreciation of his importance. His work extends from Creation to his own day (late 12th century), and is based on a wide array of sources, many of which are now lost.

These include Syriac chronicles such as those of Jacob of Edessa, John of Litharb, Dionysius of Tell-Mahre, as well as non-Orthodox Syriac authors like Elias of Nisibis and Theophilus of Edessa. Michael also cites local chronicles, council records, biographies, theological pamphlets, and Greek historians, alongside letters and official reports. He drew heavily on John of Asia for the period of Emperor Tiberius III.

Medieval and modern scholars alike have hailed Michael's work as "undoubtedly the greatest of all Syriac chronicles. It preserves priceless excerpts from otherwise lost Syriac historians, including Dionysius of Tell-Mahre. Scholars emphasize that Michael's historiographical method was consistent with medieval practice but rooted in the strong tradition of Syriac Christian historical writing, which shaped the historiography of the Syriac Orthodox Church, culminating in Bar Hebraeus (1226–1286), who drew extensively on Michael.

Although Moses of Mardin collaborated with European scholars in the 16th century, the Chronicle itself remained unknown in Europe until the Armenian version circulated in the 19th century. Joseph Assemani ignored it, and it was only through Chabot's edition that it entered mainstream Oriental studies. Today, the Chronicle remains a central source for the history of Byzantium, Islam, Crusades, and the medieval Near East, in addition to its role in preserving Syriac identity.

As Michael began to write more personally in the final parts of his Chronicle, compassion and sensitivity became visible: sadness at death by violence and war and sympathy for living beings in pain were prevalent elements of his later writings.

== Other works ==
Although best remembered for his monumental Chronicle, Michael the Great was also an active theologian, liturgist, and ecclesiastical legislator. His surviving and attributed writings demonstrate the breadth of his intellectual, pastoral, and historical activity within the Syriac Orthodox Church.

=== Liturgy and canons ===
- Anaphora — preserved in several manuscripts (six in European collections), including a collection of prayers arranged alphabetically
- Liturgy in 16 pages — arranged according to the alphabet, beginning with the invocation: "Almighty God and Lord of all, make us worthy to draw near to this great divine mystery"
- Definitive structure of the pontificate and its rituals — a revision of the ecclesiastical hierarchy and rituals (partly edited in later centuries)
- Canons — a collection of twenty-nine canons enacted at the Monastery of Mar Hananya in 1166, followed by twelve more in 1174; several were cited by Bar Hebraeus in his Nomocanon
- Sedra and Busqyos — including two busqyos (liturgical hymns), one dedicated to St. Barsauma, both of which entered the liturgy of the Syriac Orthodox Church

=== Homilies, poetry, and encomia ===
- Homilies — a large collection for Sundays and church feasts; the Edessene Chronicler notes that Michael transcribed in his own hand a huge volume of existing homilies and added his own compositions
- Metric Homilies — two in verse, one on John of Mardin and the other on Barsouma
- Poems and Odes:
  - A heptasyllabic ode (1159) on a young woman martyred for her faith in Tal'afar
  - A dodecasyllabic ode (1167) praising John, Metropolitan of Mardin (d. 1165)
  - Another dodecasyllabic ode in praise of St. Barsauma, partially preserved (28 pages extant)
  - Short poems, including one on the bishop of Mardin
- Encomia — including one dedicated to Dionysios bar Salibi

=== Theology and polemics ===
- Confession of Faith — composed in Antioch and addressed to Emperor Manuel I Komnenos in 1169
- Arguments against the Albigensians (Albigeois) — written in Antioch and sent to Manuel I in 1178, intended for the Lateran Council, though Michael ultimately declined to attend in person
- Treatise on confession before communion — a polemical response to Mark Ibn Kunbar, a 12th-century Coptic priest of the Alexandrian Church
- Treatise against falsifications of Mark, son of Qanbar the Copt — likely composed in Arabic, though some attribution is disputed
- Letter of Simeon the Stylite — Michael preserves and affirms Simeon's opposition to the Council of Chalcedon by citing his letter to Emperor Leo, which opposes the Chalcedonian claims that he accepted the Fourth Council of the Empire

=== Chronography and biography ===
- Revision of the Life of Mar Abbai of Nicaea — undertaken in 1185; draws from earlier Syriac sources such as John Rufus
- Reconstruction of the biography of Abbai of Nicaea — preserved in a manuscript dated 1196 in the British Museum
- Obituary of Mar Barsaumo
- Recommendation for Bar Wahbun (1172) — a letter of recommendation when sending him to meet a Byzantine delegate to discuss potential union of the churches following the brief schism

== Veneration and legacy ==
Michael the Great

Mor Michael Rabo
- Born: Michael ܡܝܟܐܝܠ
- Resting place: Mor Bar Sauma Monastery
- Honored in: Oriental Orthodox Churches, especially Syriac Orthodox Church
- Feast: November 7
- Tradition or genre: Syriac Christianity

Michael the Great is one of the most highly venerated saints in the Oriental Orthodox communion, especially within the Syriac Orthodox Church, where he is remembered for his scholarship, sanctity, and wisdom. His feast is celebrated on November 7, the anniversary of his repose in 1199. The late patriarch Ignatius Aphrem I Barsoum (1887-1957) of the Syriac Orthodox Church describes him as:

...one of the greatest pontiffs of the Church of God, the finest of the Patriarchs of Antioch, a scholar, and a famous chronicler; of everlasting name, of graceful pursuit, and of uncommon qualities, of widely known virtues, and of good deeds. [...] Is it not right for the general history of the world to remember your honorable name since you have written those volumes that are full of the events of the ages, from their inception until your happy reign, for you have brought to life what took place, and had it not been for you, these would have been totally forgotten? Indeed, it is befitting to do so for the world in general and for your nation in particular. Your greatness is manifest not only in this, but also in the fact that you were magnificent in your virtues, endurance and self-esteem. You were great in your Patriarchal works. It is no wonder that history describes you as "the Great."

=== 800th Anniversary (1999) ===
On the 800th anniversary of Michael's passing, the Syriac Orthodox Patriarchate of Antioch declared 1999 the "Year of Saint Michael the Great." A solemn Divine Liturgy was celebrated in honor of Mor Michael Rabo at St. Ephrem's Monastery in Ma'arrat Saydnaya. Although a symposium of scholars and orientalists had been planned for Aleppo, it was ultimately convened at the Patriarchal Theological Seminary at St. Ephrem's Monastery in Saydnaya from October 1 to 8, 1999.

=== Scholarly legacy and enduring influence ===
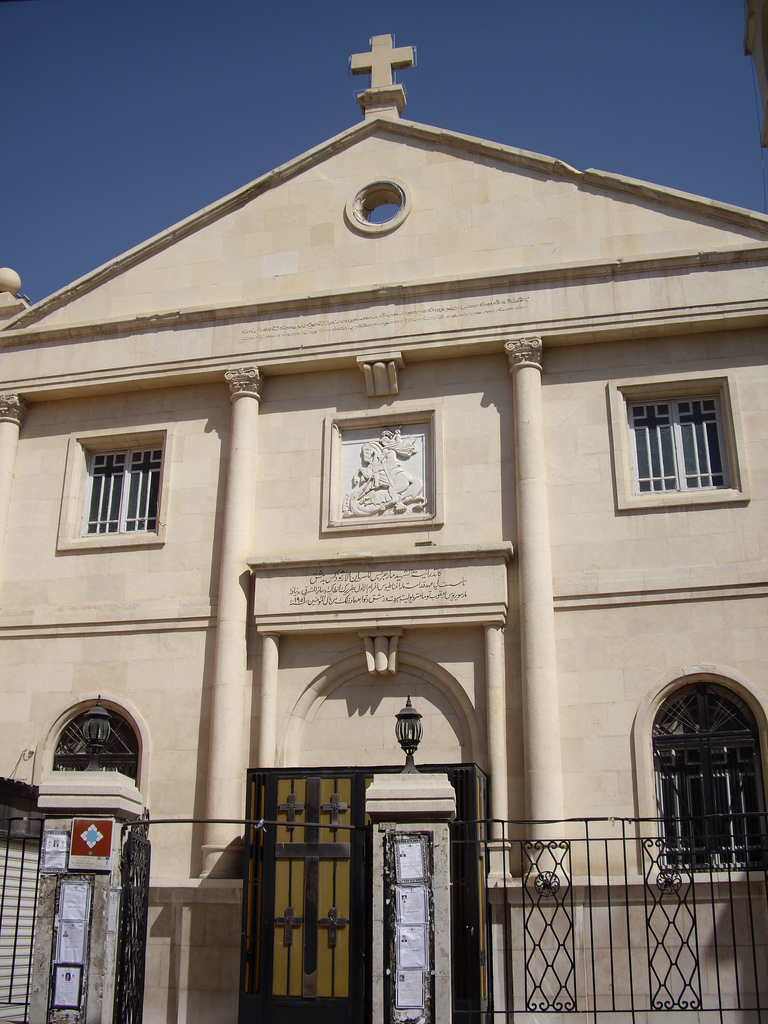
Saint George Syriac Orthodox Cathedral, located in Damascus, serves as the current seat of the Patriarchate of Antioch

Michael's Chronicle is regarded as the most voluminous historical work in the Syriac Orthodox tradition, foundational to later historiography. Sebastian Brock describes it as "undoubtedly the greatest of all Syriac chronicles." His era catalyzed what scholars call the "Syriac Renaissance," a period of cultural and theological revival within the Syriac Orthodox Church.

Michael is further remembered as a poet, canonist, and defender of the faith, whose example continues to inspire Syriac Orthodox faithful to, as the patriarchate of Antioch describes, "hold to the faith, work according to the law of the Lord, persist in it day and night, and comply with the Canon of the Church... that it may keep us within the fold of Christ Jesus, our Lord."

Following the Assyrian genocide, the Syriac Orthodox Patriarchal See was forcibly relocated from Mardin, Turkey, in 1924, after the establishment of the Turkish Republic. This patriarchal seat had been established by Michael in 1166 and remained in Mardin until that time, marking the first change in nearly a millennium. It was relocated to Homs, Syria and later to Damascus, where it remains today as the Syriac Orthodox Patriarchal Archdiocese of Damascus.

== See also ==
- Syriac literature
- Chronicle of 1234
- Chronicle of Zuqnin
- Cave of Treasures
- Philoxenus of Mabbug
- Christology
- Council of Ephesus
- Mor Hananyo Monastery
- Byzantine–Seljuk wars

== Sources ==
- Barsoum, Ignatius Aphram (2003). The Scattered Pearls: A History of Syriac Literature and Sciences. Translated by Moosa, Matti (Second rev. ed.). Piscataway (N. J.): Gorgias Press. ISBN 1-931956-04-9.
- Dinno, Khalid S. (2017). The Syrian Orthodox Christians in the Late Ottoman Period and Beyond: Crisis, Then Revival. Gorgias Eastern Christian studies. Piscataway (N.J.): Gorgias Press. ISBN 978-1-4632-0575-1.
- Harrak, Amir; Debié, Muriel; Ginkel, Jan J. van (2019). Harrak, Amir (ed.). The Chronicle of Michael the Great (the Edessa-Aleppo Syriac codex): books XV-XXI from the year 1050 to 1195. Gorgias Chronicles of Late Antiquity. Translated by Harrak, Amir. Piscataway, NJ: Gorgias Press. ISBN 978-1-4632-4031-8.
- Brock, Sebastian P.; Butts, Aaron M.; Kiraz, George A.; Van Rompay, Lucas; E. Fiano (2011). "Gorgias Encyclopedic Dictionary of the Syriac Heritage". Beth Mardutho. ISBN 9781593337148 – via Academia.edu.
- Bar-Abrahem, Abdulmesih (1998). "Patriarch Michael the Great: Beyond his World Chronicle" (PDF). Journal of Assyrian Academic Studies. 12 (2): 33–45. Archived from the original (PDF) on 20 April 2003.
- Bcheiry, Iskandar (2004). "A List of the Syrian Orthodox Patriarchs between 16th and 18th Century: A Historical Supplement to Michael the Syrian's Chronicle in a MS. of Sadad" (PDF). Parole de l'Orient. 29: 211–261.
- Brock, Sebastian P. (1980). "Syriac Historical Writing: A Survey of the Main Sources" (PDF). Journal of the Iraq Academy: Syriac Corporation. 5: 1–30.
- Brock, Sebastian P. (1992). Studies in Syriac Christianity: History, Literature, and Theology. Aldershot: Variorum. ISBN 9780860783053.
- Brock, Sebastian P. (1996). Syriac Studies: A Classified Bibliography, 1960-1990. Kaslik: Parole de l'Orient.
- Brock, Sebastian P. (1997). A Brief Outline of Syriac Literature. Kottayam: St. Ephrem Ecumenical Research Institute. ISBN 978-1-61143-563-4.
- Brock, Sebastian P. (2006). Fire from Heaven: Studies in Syriac Theology and Liturgy. Aldershot: Ashgate. ISBN 9780754659082.
- Chabot, Jean-Baptiste (1899a). "La Chronique de Michel le Syrien". Comptes rendus des séances de l'Académie des Inscriptions et Belles-Lettres. 43 (4): 476–484.
- Chabot, Jean-Baptiste (1899b). Chronique de Michel le Syrien, patriarche jacobite d'Antioche (1166–1199). Vol. 1. Paris: Ernest Leroux. ISBN 9785881102456.
- Chabot, Jean-Baptiste (1901). Chronique de Michel le Syrien, patriarche jacobite d'Antioche (1166–1199). Vol. 2. Paris: Ernest Leroux. ISBN 9785881814632.
- Chabot, Jean-Baptiste (1905). Chronique de Michel le Syrien, patriarche jacobite d'Antioche (1166–1199). Vol. 3. Paris: Ernest Leroux. ISBN 9785884196919.
- Chabot, Jean-Baptiste (1910). Chronique de Michel le Syrien, patriarche jacobite d'Antioche (1166–1199). Vol. 4. Paris: Ernest Leroux.
- Chabot, Jean-Baptiste (1924). Chronique de Michel le Syrien, patriarche jacobite d'Antioche (1166–1199). Vol. Supplement. Paris: Ernest Leroux.
- Debié, Muriel (2009). "Syriac Historiography and Identity Formation". Church History and Religious Culture. 89 (1–3): 93–114. doi:10.1163/187124109X408014.
- Debié, Muriel; Taylor, David G. K. (2012). "Syriac and Syro-Arabic Historical Writing, c. 500-c. 1400". The Oxford History of Historical Writing. Vol. 2. Oxford: Oxford University Press. pp. 155–179. ISBN 978-0-19-923642-8.
- Ginkel, Jan J. van (1998). "Making History: Michael the Syrian and his Sixth-Century Sources". Symposium Syriacum VII. Roma: Pontificio Istituto Orientale. pp. 351–358. ISBN 9788872103197.
- Ginkel, Jan J. van (2006). "Michael the Syrian and his Sources: Reflections on the Methodology of Michael the Great as a Historiographer and its Implications for Modern Historians". Journal of the Canadian Society for Syriac Studies. 6: 53–60. doi:10.31826/jcsss-2009-060107. S2CID 212688456.
- Ginkel, Jan J. van (2008). "Aramaic Brothers or Heretics: The Image of the East Syrians in the Chronography of Michael the Great (d. 1199)". The Harp. 23: 359–368.
- Ginkel, Jan J. van (2010). "A Man Is Not an Island: Reflections of the Historiography of the Early Syriac Renaissance in Michael the Great". The Syriac Renaissance. Leuven: Peeters Publishers. pp. 113–121.
- Harrak, Amir, ed. (2019). The Chronicle of Michael the Great (The Edessa-Aleppo Syriac Codex): Books XV–XXI, from the Year 1050 to 1195 AD. Piscataway, NJ: Gorgias Press. ISBN 9781463240318.
- Gregorios Y. Ibrahim (ed.), Text and Translations of the Chronicle of Michael the Great. The Edessa-Aleppo Syriac Codex of the Chronicle of Michael the Great, Vol. 1, Piscataway, NJ: Gorgias Press (2009).
- Kaufhold, Hubert (2000). "Notizen zur Späten Geschichte des Barsaumo-Klosters". Hugoye: Journal of Syriac Studies. 3 (2).
- Morony, Michael G. (2000). "Michael the Syrian as a Source for Economic History" (PDF). Hugoye: Journal of Syriac Studies. 3 (2): 141–172. doi:10.31826/hug-2010-030111. S2CID 212689089.
- Morony, Michael G. (2005). "History and Identity in the Syrian Churches". Redefining Christian Identity: Cultural Interaction in the Middle East Since the Rise of Islam. Leuven: Peeters Publishers. ISBN 9789042914186.
- Saint-Laurent, Jeanne-Nicole Mellon (2015). Missionary Stories and the Formation of the Syriac Churches (1 ed.). University of California Press. ISBN 978-0-520-28496-8. JSTOR 10.1525/j.ctt19632bn.
- Weltecke, Dorothea (1 January 2009). "Michael the Syrian and Syriac Orthodox Identity". Church History and Religious Culture. 89 (1): 115–125. doi:10.1163/187124109X408023. ISSN 1871-2428.
- Reller, Jobst (2017). "Patriarch Michael the Syrian's Views on Islam in the Context of Syriac Historiography and Philosophy". Syriac in its Multi-Cultural Context. Leuven: Peeters Publishers. pp. 187–207. ISBN 9789042931640.
- Rompay, Lucas van (1999). "Jacob of Edessa and the Early History of Edessa". After Bardaisan: Studies on Continuity and Change in Syriac Christianity. Louvain: Peeters Publishers. pp. 269–285. ISBN 9789042907355.
- Schmidt, Andrea B. (2013). "The Armenian Versions I and II of Michael the Syrian" (PDF). Hugoye: Journal of Syriac Studies. 16 (1): 93–128. doi:10.31826/hug-2014-160105. S2CID 212688681.
- Tarzi, Joseph (2000). "Edessa in the Era of Patriarch Michael The Syrian" (PDF). Hugoye: Journal of Syriac Studies. 3 (2): 203–221.
- Weltecke, Dorothea (1997). "The World Chronicle by Patriarch Michael the Great (1126-1199): Some Reflections" (PDF). Journal of Assyrian Academic Studies. 11 (2): 6–29. Archived from the original (PDF) on 9 June 2003.
- Weltecke, Dorothea (2010). "Originality and Function of Formal Structures in the Chronicle of Michael the Great". Hugoye: Journal of Syriac Studies. 3 (2): 173–202. doi:10.31826/hug-2010-030112 – via ResearchGate.
- Weltecke, Dorothea (2011). "Michael I Rabo". Gorgias Encyclopedic Dictionary of the Syriac Heritage. Piscataway, NJ: Gorgias Press. pp. 287–290.
- Witakowski, Witold (2011). "Historiography, Syriac". Gorgias Encyclopedic Dictionary of the Syriac Heritage. Piscataway, NJ: Gorgias Press. pp. 199–203.
- Wright, William (1894). A Short History of Syriac Literature. London: Adam and Charles Black.

Preceded by Athanasius VII bar Qatra	Syriac Orthodox Patriarch of Antioch; 1166–1199	Succeeded by Athanasius VIII
