= St. Mary's Jacobite Syrian Cathedral, Kothamangalam =

Martha Mariyam Cathedral Valiyapally, Kothamangalam
- കോതമംഗലം മര്‍ത്തമറിയം കത്തീഡ്രല്‍ വലിയപള്ളി
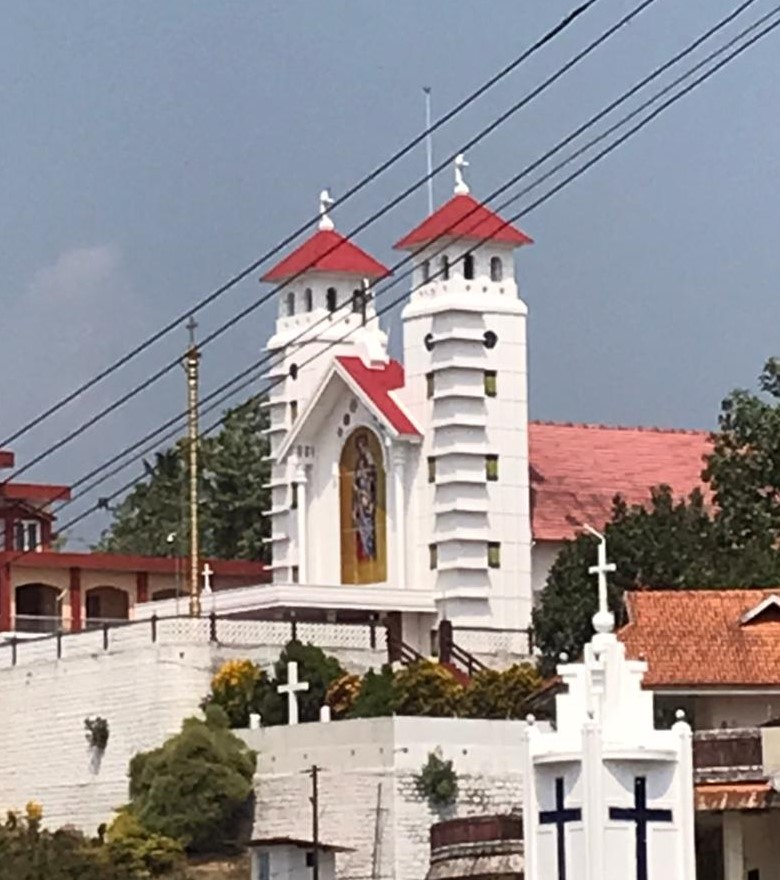
- Martha Mariyam Cathedral Cathedral Valiyapally, Kothamangalam
- Martha Mariyam Cathedral Valiyapally, Kothamangalam
- 10.0642781°N 76.6301738°E
- Location: Kothamangalam, Ernakulam, India
- Denomination: Malankara Jacobite Syrian Church
- Website: http://valiyapally.com

History
- Status: Cathedral, Valiyapally

Architecture
- Style: Kerala Architecture
- Years built: 498 to 1340

Administration
- District: Ernakulam
- Province: Kothamangalam
- Diocese: Angamaly

Clergy
- Archbishop: Aboon Mor Baselios Joseph, Catholicos of the East and Malankara Metropolitan (Metropolitan of Angamaly)
- Bishop(s): Mor Yulios Elias, Metropolitan of Kothamangalam
- Vicar: Fr. Abraham Saji

Martha Mariyam Cathedral or St. Mary's Church is a prominent Valiyapally (Principal Church) of the Syriac Orthodox Church situated in Kothamangalam town in the Ernakulam district of Kerala, India.

It is one of the earliest Christian churches in India. According to a local belief, the church was founded on or before the 4th century by a few Syrian Christian families who had migrated from Paravur and Angamali. The new church was established in 1338 AD by four Syrian Christian merchants who bought the entire land of Kothamangalam from a local chief for commodity trading with the nearby state of Tamil Nadu.

== History ==
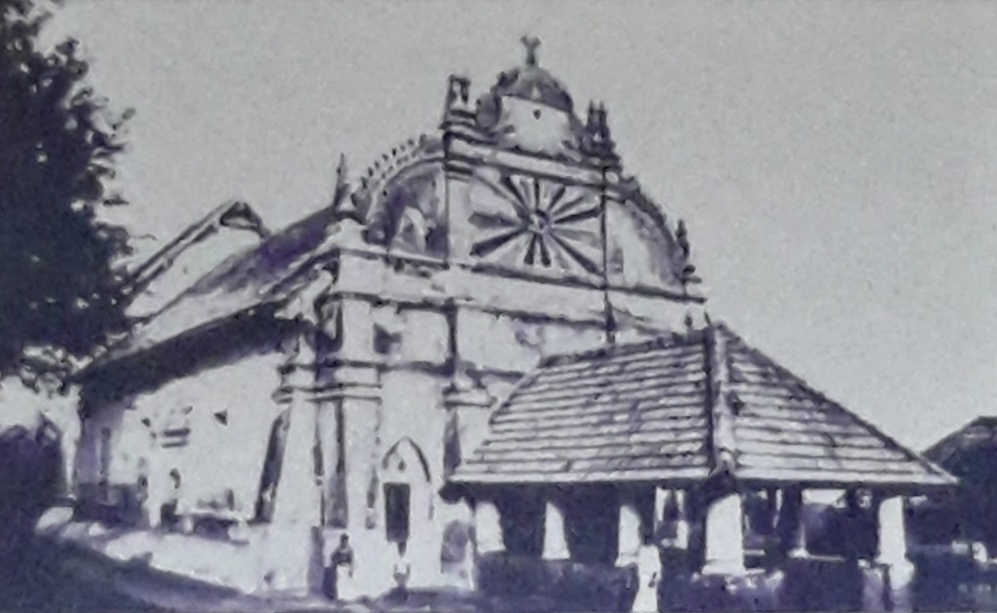

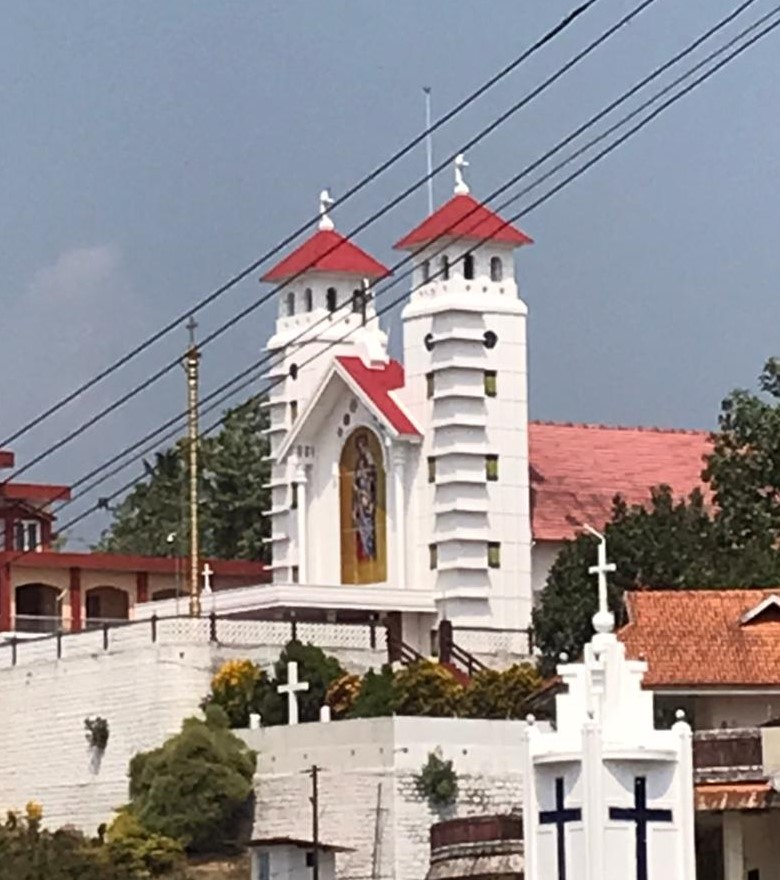

Kothamangalam was a major commercial city during the Portuguese period. The Martha Mariyam Cathedral church at Kothamangalam, commonly known as Valiyapally is the oldest of all the churches in the region. Present Kothamangalam region was historically known as Malakhachira (മാലാഖച്ചിറ, which literally means "Place of the Angel"). The name came from a legend associated with Thomas the Apostle. According to tradition, the Apostle, during his mission in India, stayed in this region where he had a vision of archangel Gabriel who instructed him to establish seven and a half churches in Malankara. According to tradition, Mar Yuhannon stayed at Kothamangalam church and had visited Angamaly Church.

== Altars ==
The altars in the Martha Mariyam church are dedicated to the blessed Virgin Mary, Saint George, Saint John the Baptist, and Apostles Saint Peter, Saint Paul and Saint Thomas

== Feasts ==
The most important festivals of the church are celebrated on 10 February and 15 August.

== Holy Soonoro ==
A small portion of the Holy Girdle of Saint Mary, rediscovered at the Syriac Orthodox Church at Homs in 1953 by Patriarch of Antioch Ignatius Aphrem I Barsoum, was established in this church In 1980 by the diocesan Metropolitan Thomas Mor Dionysius.

== Historical Events ==
- All the six Patriarchs of Antioch who had visited Malankara in the last two centuries came to this church as well. The last of these Patriarchal visits was that of Patriarch Ignatius Aphrem II in 2015. It was during such a visit that Patriarch Ignatius Zakka Iwas I had ordained an assistant metropolitan for the diocese by name Mor Severios Abraham, at the Kothamangalam Cheriapally.
- As per the biography of Saint Gregorios of Malankara written by Mookencheril Paily Varkey in 1903, Palakunnath Mathews Mar Athanasius ordained St. Gregorios of Parumala as Korooyo in this church in 1858.
- From 1974 to 1997, the building adjacent to the Valiyapally was the bishop's residence of the diocesan Metropolitan.

== Gallery ==
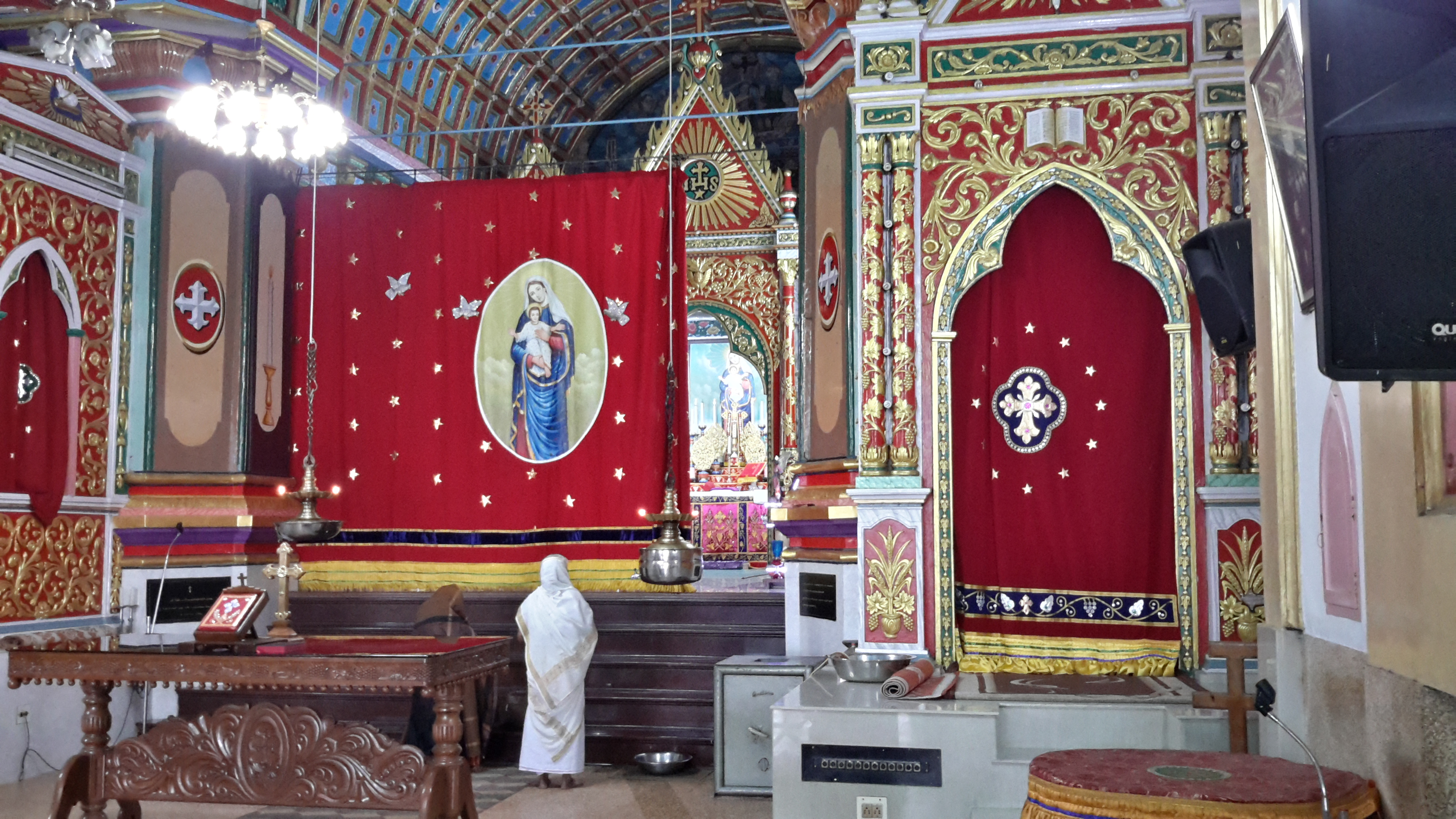
Kothamanagalam Valiyapally Madbaho (altar).

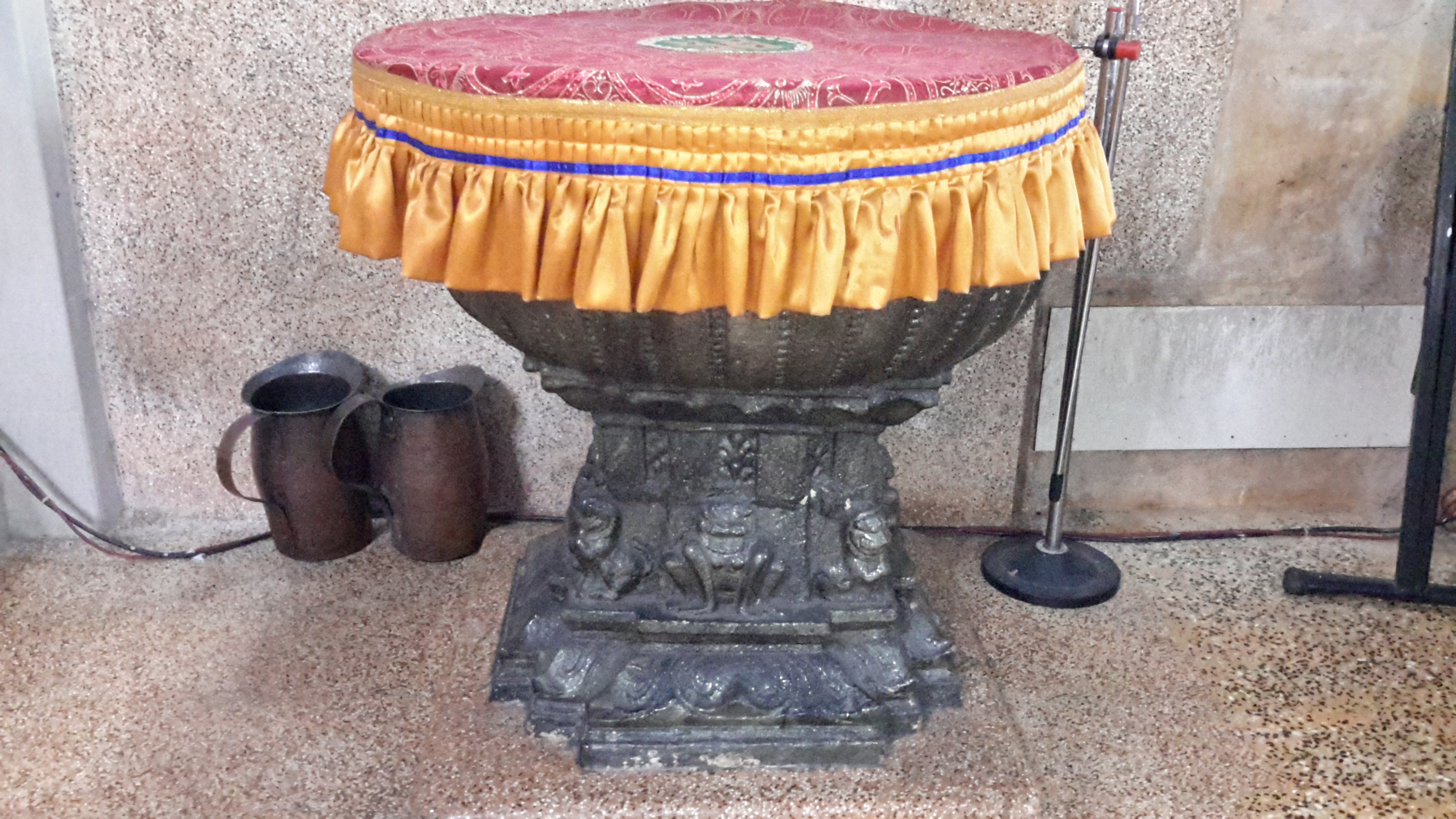
Baptismal font of the church.

== See also ==
- Marthoma Cheriapally Kothamangalam
- Saint Mary Church of the Holy Belt
