= Severios Abraham =

Syriac Orthodox Metropolitan of Angamali, India

His Grace Mor Dr. Severios Abraham Valiya Metropolitan
- Valiya Metropolitan of Angamali
- Native name: അബ്രാഹം മോർ സേവേറിയോസ്
- Church: Malankara Syriac Orthodox Church
- See: Holy Apostolic See of Antioch & All East
- Successor: Mor Anthimos Mathews
- Other post: Abbot of Dayro d-Mor Gabriel
- Previous post: Assistant Metropolitan of Angamali Diocese

Orders
- Ordination: 1965 (Kassisso) by Mor Gregorios Geevarghese, Vayaliparambil
- Consecration: 6 March 1982 by Patriarch Ignatius Zakka I & Catholicos Baselios Paulose II
- Rank: Valiya Metropolitan

Personal details
- Born: Abraham Alukkal; 12 July 1941 Angamaly, Kerala
- Denomination: Malankara Syriac Orthodox Church (Oriental Orthodox Church)
- Residence: Dayro d-Mor Gabriel
- Education: Pacific University

Mor Severios Abraham or Abraham Mor Severios (born Abraham Alukkal; 12 July 1941) is an Indian Prelate, who is the Great Metropolitan of Angamali and Abbot of Dayro d-Mor Gabriel. He previously served as the bishop of the Angamaly Region of the Angamali Diocese. He is the most senior bishop of the Malankara Syriac Orthodox Church.

== Early years ==
Abraham Alukkal was born as member of the Alukkal family in Peechanikkad, Ankamali on 12 July 1941. In 1965 he was ordained deacon by Mor Gregorios Geevarghese Vayaliparambil of Ankamali. In the same year he was ordained by Mor Gregorios as 'Kasshisso'.

== Education ==
He graduated from Community College, Chicago and completed his theological studies from Russian Leningrad Theological Academy and Theological College at Wycliffe Hall, Oxford. He obtained his Th.D. degree from Pacific Western University (California). Abraham served as the vicar of St. Peter's Church in Chicago under Archbishop Mor Athanasius Yeshue Samuel from 1979 to 1981. Before this, he was at the Thrikkunnathu Seminary in Aluva. In 1982, the Ankamali Diocesan Council, held under Dionysius Thomas (Aboon Mor Baselios Thomas I), chose Abraham as the Assistant Metropolitan of the Diocese.

== Ordination ==
Abraham was ordained metropolitan in the name Mor Severios on 6 March 1982, in a ceremony presided by Mor Ignatius Zakka I Iwas and assisted by the Catholicose Aboon Mor Baselios Paulose II at the Marthoman Cheriapally, Kothamangalam. Mor Severios Abraham is the only prelate ordained by Patriarch Mor Ignatius Zakka I Iwas in Malankara.

== Charity works ==
After assuming charge as the auxiliary bishop of Ankamali Diocese, Abraham Mor Severios commenced many charity programs. He founded the Guardian Angel Institution in 1985. A list of few institutions started by Severios are:

- Guardian Angel Retirement Home, (1984) Kilikulam, Airapuram PO.
- Bethsada Destitute Home for the Dying, Vengola.
- Yeldho Mor Baselios orphanage, Kothamangalam.
- Bethsaida Public School, Vengola.
- Bethsaida Junior school, Kilikulam.
- Bethsaida Mental Health Center, Vengola (1993).
- Peace mission, Nedumbassery.
- Mor Gabriel Dayro (Monastery).

== Responsibilities ==
As of 2013:

- Abbot of Mor Gabriel Dayaro, Vengola
- Metropolitan of Ankamali Region of Ankamali Diocese

== See also ==
- Syriac Orthodox Church
- Jacobite Syrian Christian Church
