= Gregorios Gabriel =

Syriac Orthodox archbishop

His Grace Mor Gregorios Gabriel Metropolitan
- Church: Jacobite Syrian Orthodox Church
- Diocese: Angamali Diocese Muvattupuzha Region
- See: Holy Apostolic See of Antioch & All East
- Other posts: Abbot of Dayro d'Mor Philoxenos, Vazhapilly

Orders
- Ordination: 9 November 2011 by Mor Aphrem Mathews
- Consecration: 30 June 2026 by Baselios Joseph
- Rank: Metropolitan

Personal details
- Born: Kalappurayil; 23 November 1980 Kerala, India
- Residence: Muvattupuzha
- Parents: Kalappurayil Abraham Varghese and Moly Varghese
- Education: B.Com from Mahatma Gandhi University, Kerala, Theology from Presbyterian Theological Seminary, Dehradun, Uttarakhand, M.Th from University of Salzburg
- Alma mater: Mahatma Gandhi University, Kerala, University of Salzburg

Mor Gregorios Gabriel is an Indian prelate of the Syriac Orthodox Church, currently serving as the Metropolitan of the Muvattupuzha Region of the Angamali Diocese. "Mor Gregorios Gabriel consecrated Angamaly Metropolitan - The Hindu".
