= Aphrem Mathews =

Syriac Orthodox Church Metropolitan of Perumbavur Region of Angamali Diocese, India

His Grace Mor Aphrem Mathews Metropolitan of Perumbavoor Region
- Church: Jacobite Syrian Orthodox Church
- Diocese: Angamali Diocese
- See: Perumbavoor Region

Orders
- Ordination: 27 May 1994 (Kassisso) by Yuhanon Mor Philoxenos
- Consecration: 3 July 2006 by Baselios Thomas I Catholicos
- Rank: Metropolitan

Personal details
- Born: James Chitteth; 5 August 1968 Wayanad
- Education: B.A Economics from Calicut University, M.A Economics from Maharaja's College, Ernakulam, Diploma in Theology from Malecuriz Dayro & M.S.O.T. Seminary, B.D from United Theological College, Bangalore, M.Th. from United Theological College, Bangalore
- Alma mater: Calicut University, Mahatma Gandhi University, Kerala; Serampore University

Mor Aphrem Mathews (James Chitteth; born 5 August 1968) is a Syriac Orthodox bishop and the Metropolitan of the Perumbavoor region of the Angamali diocese.

== Early life ==
James Chitteth was born to Skaria and Sossamma Chitteth on 5 August 1968 in Arincherumala, Wayanad District.

== Education ==
Chitteth had his schooling at the Government Higher Secondary School in Panamaram, Wayanad District. His Bachelor of Economics degree was from the University of Calicut. Soon after his graduation, Chitteth joined Malecuriz Dayro for Theology Education and earned a Diploma in Theology from Malankara Syrian Orthodox Seminary, Vettikkal, Mulanthuruthy. He was appointed as a teacher in Holy liturgy in the seminary after his theology studies. He earned his Master of Economics from Maharajas College, affiliated with Mahatma Gandhi University.

Chitteth joined United Theological College, Bangalore for higher studies in Theology and earned his Bachelor of Divinity in 1998 from the Senate of Serampore College (University). He was awarded his Master of Theology in Systematic Theology in 2001 by the Senate.

In 2004 Chitteth went to the United States for his higher studies in Theology and was called to Bishophood during his studies.

== Priesthood ==
Thanono Yuhanon Mor Philexinos, Metropolitan of Malabar, ordained James Chitteth as sub-deacon on 14 March 1991. He was ordained Apudiyaqono on 19 April 1993 by Geevarghese Mor Gregorios (Perumpally Thirumeni). Dn. James was ordained Kassisso by Thanono Yuhanon Mor Philexinos in the year 1994 and was appointed as the Vicar of St. Mary's Jacobite Syrian Soonoro Church, Velamkode, Kozhikode District. He later served at St. Mary's Jacobite Syrian Church, Poothadi, Wayanad District.

During his higher studies at United Theological College, Bangalore, he served at St. Mary's Jacobite Syrian Orthodox Cathedral, Queens Road, Bangalore; St. Ignatius Elais III Jacobite Syrian Orthodox Church, Krishnarajapuram; St. Peter's and St. Paul's Jacobite Syrian Orthodox Church, Mathekkere; and Ananthpur and Mysore Churches in Outside Kerala Diocese as parish priest. Later during his tenure in MSOT, he served at St. George Jacobite Syrian Orthodox Simhasana Church, Pambra; St. George Jacobite Syrian Orthodox Simhasana Church, Perumpilly (both the churches under Ignatius Zakka I Iwas); St. Mary's Jacobite Syrian Church, Eroor (under Diocese of Kochi); and St. Mary's Jacobite Syrian Orthodox Church, Chembu which is under the Diocese of Kandanad.

During his studies in USA, he served at St. Mary's Jacobite Syrian Church, Denver; St. Mary's Jacobite Syrian church, Detroit; and St. Mary's Jacobite Syrian Church, Canada as Vicar. All of those churches were part of the Malankara Arch Diocese of North America.

== Professorship ==
After attaining the master's degree in Theology from The Senate of Serampore College (University), James Chitteth joined the faculty of Malankara Syrian Orthodox Theological Seminary in Mulanthuruthy. He taught Systematic Theology, Orthodox Faith, Syrian Liturgical Music and Hebrew. During this period, he served as the Bursar, Malpan & Student's Warden of the Seminary.

== Episcopacy ==
In the year 2006, The Holy Episcopal Synod, with the permission of Supreme Head of the Church, Ignatius Zakka I Iwas, decided to split Ankamali Diocese—the largest Diocese in the Universal Syrian Orthodox Church—into four regions, which was later approved by the diocesan council. Council suggested the name of James Chitteth as the metropolitan of the High Range Region of the Diocese. The election was unanimous. The election was approved by the Managing Committee, Working Committee, Malankara Episcopal Synod and later by Ignatius Zakka I Iwas.

At Karingachira St. George Jacobite Syrian Cathedral, Baselios Thomas I ordained him as Rabban (monk) with the name Nahum on 2 July 2006, along with four others.

On 3 July 2006, Nahum Rabban along with four other monks, was raised to the highest order of bishophood—metropolitan—by Baselios Thomas I, at St. Thomas Jacobite Syrian Orthodox Church, North Paravoor, where Patriarch of Antioch, Moran Mor Ignatius Peter IV consecrated St. Gregorios Geevarghese, Chathuruthil along with others in 1876. Rabban Nahum was ordained with the name MOR APHREM MATHEWS. He is the only Metropolitan in the Universal Syrian Orthodox Church with the name Aphrem. Mor Aphrem was given charge of High Range Region of Ankamali Diocese, under Baselios Thomas I, who is the Diocesan Metropolitan.

Metropolitans Thanono Dr.Yuhanon Mor Philaxinos, Thomas Mor Timotheos, Joseph Mor Gregorios, Mor Ivanios Mathews, Yuhanon Mor Militos, Mor Yulius Kuriakose, Mor Dionysius Geevarghese, Mor Theophilos Kuriakose and Mor Severios Kuriakose assisted Catholicose in the consecration.

== See also ==
- Syriac Orthodox Church
- Jacobite Syrian Christian Church
