= Angamaly Diocese =

Angamaly Diocese may refer to:

- Archdiocese of Angamaly
- Malankara Syrian Orthodox Diocese of Angamaly
- Syro-Malabar Catholic Major Archeparchy of Ernakulam–Angamaly
- Angamaly Malankara Orthodox Diocese
- Angamali West Orthodox Diocese
