= Malankara Varghese murder case =

2002 murder case in India

The Malankara Varghese Murder Case is a case regarding the death of T. M. Varghese also known as Malankara Varghese, a member of Malankara Orthodox Syrian Church's managing committee and a timber merchant on 5 December 2002. He was hacked to death by a gang outside a car workshop on main central road near Perumbavoor. Though the murder was initially described as a result of business rivalry, his relatives suspected involvement of a rival church faction. India's Central Bureau of Investigation on 9 May 2010 charged Father Varghese Thekkekara, a priest and manager of the Angamali diocese in the rival Malankara Jacobite Syriac Orthodox Church (a part of the Syriac Orthodox Church) with conspiracy in the murder and named him as the prime accused.

== Investigation ==
Initially, the murder of Varghese was considered a crime conducted by his business rivals, but five years of probe by the state police’s crime branch yielded nothing conclusive. Varghese’s widow then approached the Kerala High Court, and it ordered a CBI investigation in November 2007. The CBI’s Chennai unit then accused 19 people of the murder and said it was possibly due to the long-standing feud between the Malankara Orthodox Church which has its headquarters in Kottayam and the Malankara Jacobite Syriac Orthodox Church, which has its headquarters in Ernakulam. When the CBI arrested Joy Varghese alias "Cement Joy", he confessed that he had hired the criminals who committed the murder for a large sum of money. Chief Judicial Magistrate Ernakulam allowed Joy Varghese to be in CBI custody for more investigation. Murder, scheming murder, and violation of ‘Weapons Prevention Act’ etc. were the charges against Joy Varghese. It was alleged that one of the reasons for suspects not getting arrested was political interference. "Some prominent personalities of the Syriac Orthodox Church of Antioch in India were the motive force behind Joy Varghese and there are documents showing withdrawal of Rs. 400,000.00 from their bank accounts", said CBI. CBI produced documents to the High Court in a sealed envelope. Catholicose of the East Designate Paulose Mar Milithios of the Malankara Orthodox Church expressed his contentment over the CBI actions and hoped for the prevailing of justice in the Malankara Varghese murder case.

The Kerala High Court on 1 June 2010 asked the Central Bureau of Investigation why Fr Varghese Thekkekkara, the first accused in the Malankara Varghese murder case, was not arrested, if there was evidence against him. The CBI submitted that Fr Thekkekkara cooperated with the investigation, but the arrest was avoided since it was a sensational case related to the church. But the court said this was not a sufficient reason to avoid arrest. "It is not the first time that a priest is arrayed as an accused. Does the CBI has a practice of not arresting those who cooperate with the investigation?," the court asked. Justice K Hema asked this while considering the anticipatory bail application filed by Fr Thekkekkara, and petition filed by Varghese’ widow Saramma alleging that the CBI was showing discrimination in arresting the accused.

On 11 June 2010, Malankara Orthodox Syrian Church Managing Committee endorsed a motion, which "appeals to the authorities to bring all culprits into daylight and to judicial trial, who are behind the brutal murder of Malankara Varghese, former Malankara Managing Committee Member".

On 16 June 2010 Father Varghese Thekkekara surrendered before the Chief Judicial Magistrate in Ernakulam. The magistrate M N K Leelamani granted bail to him on furnishing a bond of Rs 25,000 plus two sureties for the like amount.

On 25 February 2011 The Chief Judicial Magistrate Court, Ernakulam, directed the CBI to reinvestigate the murder of Malankara Varghese, on a petition filed by his wife, Saramma Varghese. She alleged that the charge sheet submitted by the CBI did not have the names of ‘higher ups' involved in the conspiracy to kill her husband. On 21 October 2011 the CBI unit, Thiruvananthapuram quizzed Malankara Jacobite Syriac Orthodox Church Catholicos Baselios Thomas I in connection with the murder case. The Catholicos appeared before the CBI at its office in Kochi. According to CBI sources, he was quizzed by the officials for three hours.
