= Theodosius Mathews =

Syriac Orthodox Church Metropolitan of Kollam diocese, India

His Grace Mor Theodosius Mathews Metropolitan of Kollam diocese
- Church: Jacobite Syrian Orthodox Church
- Diocese: Kollam Dioceses
- See: Holy Apostolic See of Antioch & All East

Orders
- Ordination: 1 November 1988 (Kassisso) by Koorilos Kuriakose
- Consecration: 3 July 2006 by Baselios Thomas I
- Rank: Metropolitan

Personal details
- Born: 4 May 1959 Pathanamthitta
- Parents: Mr. P G George & Mrs. Sosamma George
- Education: Master's degree in commerce

Mor Theodosius Mathews (born 4 May 1959) is a Syriac Orthodox bishop, serving as Metropolitan of Kollam diocese.
