= St. Mary's Jacobite Syrian Cathedral Church, Karakunnam =

St Mary's Jacobite Syrian Cathedral Church, Karakunnam
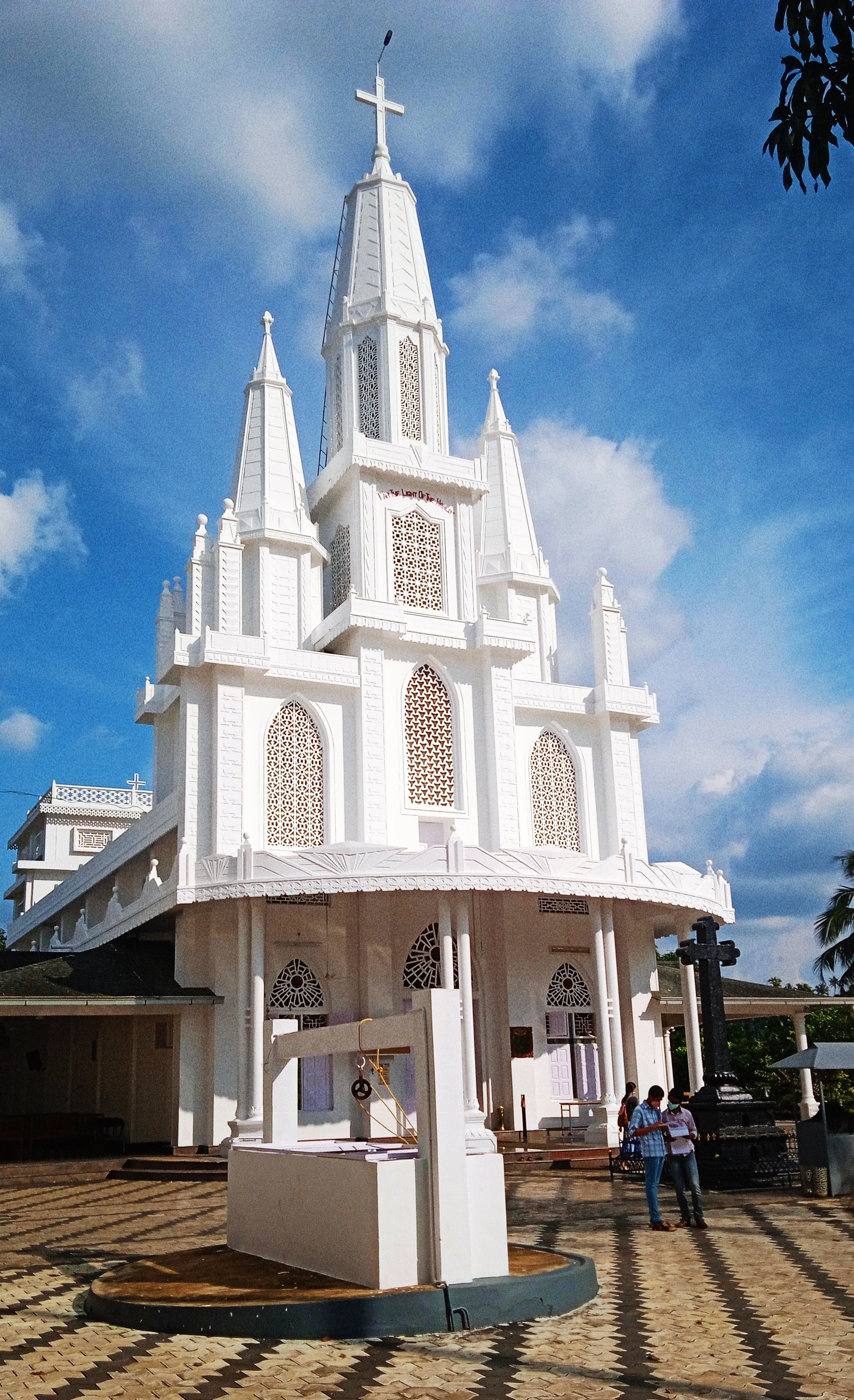
- Marth Mariam Jacobite Syrian Cathedral Church, Karakunnam
- St Mary's Jacobite Syrian Cathedral Church, Karakunnam
- 10.0024°N 76.6001°E
- Location: Karakunnam, Kerala, India
- Denomination: Jacobite Syrian Orthodox Church

History
- Status: Cathedral

Administration
- Diocese: Angamaly Diocese

St. Mary's Jacobite Syrian Cathedral Church, Karakunnam is a prominent Jacobite Syrian Orthodox church located atop a hill on the Muvattupuzha–Kothamangalam road, approximately three kilometers from Muvattupuzha in Kerala, India. The church holds significant historical, religious, and cultural importance in the Angamaly Diocese.

== History ==
=== Early Establishment ===
The area where the church now stands was historically known as Perumattom. The name "Karakkunnam" is derived from the thorny herbs, like wild kara, that once grew there. The local Syrian Christian community, which engaged in agriculture and trade, desired a church to fulfill their spiritual needs. In response, they invited Church fathers from the Kadamattom Church to establish a place of worship.

A laterite cross was initially installed at Karakunnam by the priests from Kadamattom, and a ritual known as Thamukku was introduced. The Thamukku offering remains a central part of the annual celebration for the installation of the first cross at Karakkunnam, which takes place on the Vrischikam tenth of the Malayalam calendar.

In the Malayalam year 475, a church dedicated to the Holy Virgin Mary was built to the east of the original laterite cross. A seminary called Malpan Bhavanam was also established to the south of the church. The historical significance of the church was acknowledged by Paulinus, a priest who documented the church in his 1794 work India Orientalis Christian.

=== Renovations and Significant Milestones ===
The original laterite cross was replaced with a stone cross made from rock in the 15th century. This stone cross remains in the church courtyard as a historical relic. At the same time, a chapel was constructed along the National Highway road.

On Vrischikam 20, 1752, the sacred remains of Mor Geevarghese Sahado, Mor Kuriakose Sahado, and Mor Shemuel Kadiso were enshrined in the church, adding to its religious significance.

In 1965, the church underwent significant renovations. Geevarghese Mor Gregorious, Bishop of the Angamaly Diocese, laid the foundation stone for the new church building on November 25. The church was completed and consecrated by Catholicos Moran Mor Baselios Paulose II on November 28, 1975.

In 1982, Moran Mor Ignatius Zakka I, the Patriarch of Antioch and All the East, visited the church during his Apostolic visit to Malankara and bestowed his benediction upon the church.

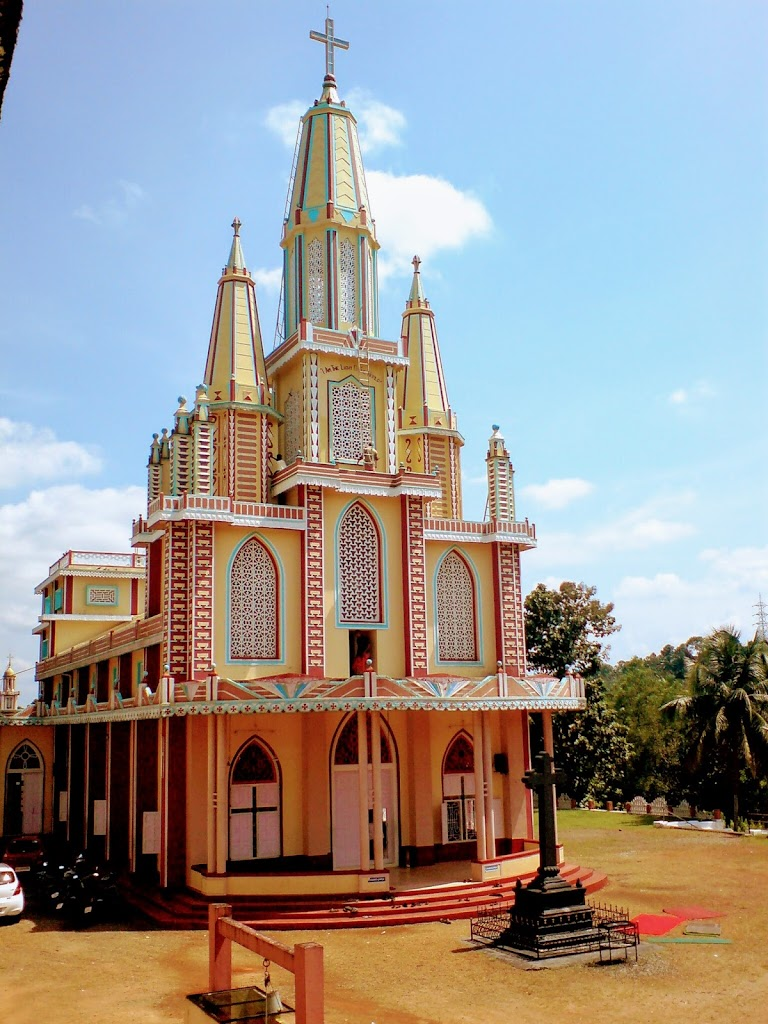
Church before renovation

=== Modern Developments ===
On January 12, 2013, St. Mary's Church Karakkunnam was elevated to the status of a Cathedral by Mor Ignatius Zakka I Iwas the Patriarch of Antioch. The Muvattupuzha area office of the Angamaly Diocese now operates from this church. The administration of the church is managed by His Grace Dr. Mathews Mor Antimose, Metropolitan of the Angamaly Diocese.

== Altars ==
The altars in the church are dedicated to the blessed Holy Virgin Mary, Saint Peter, and Saint Paul.

== Feasts ==
The church's most significant festivals are celebrated on 15 August, commemorating the Ascension of St. Mary, and on 28 November, marking the Foundation Day.

== Role in the Diocese ==
St. Mary's Church Karakkunnam serves as the Mother Church for several other churches in the region, including:

- Mulavoor St. Mary's Church
- Kalamboore St. Mary's Church
- Vazhappilly St. Mary's Church
- Karimattom St. Mary's Church
- Karakunnam St. Mary's Catholic Church
- Mor Gregorious Kurisupally at Puthuppady

The church operates according to a statute passed on April 22, 1980, and its parishioners maintain a strong commitment to the faith, with full allegiance to the Antioch Throne of St. Peter.

== Gallery ==
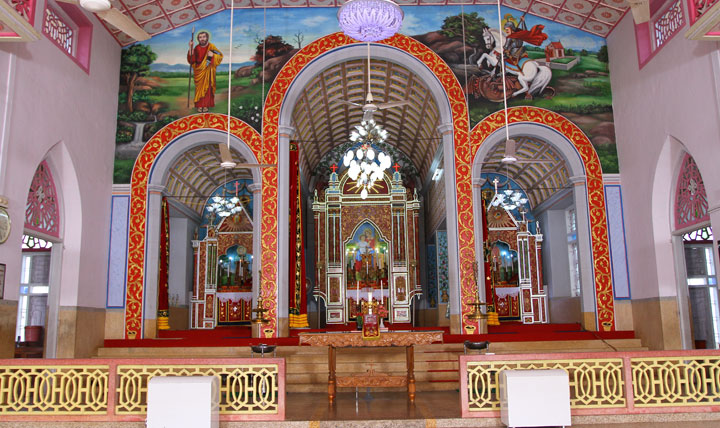
Altar of church

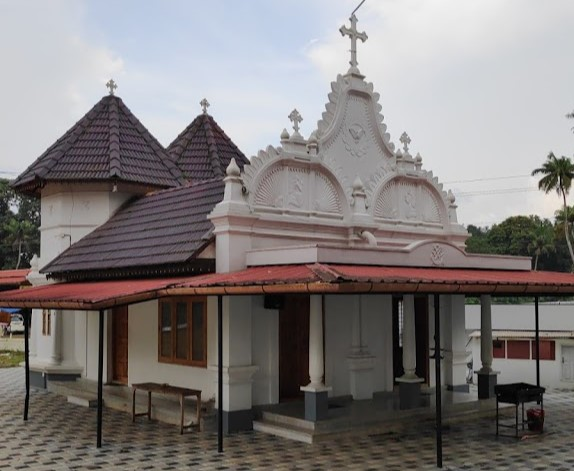
The chapel where the Holy relics of Mor Geevarghese Sahado, Mor Kuriakose Sahado and Mor Shemuel Kadiso, established on Vrschikam 20, 1720 AD
