= Marthoman Cheriyapally, Kothamangalam =

Mar Thoma Jacobite Syrian Orthodox Church, Kothamangalam
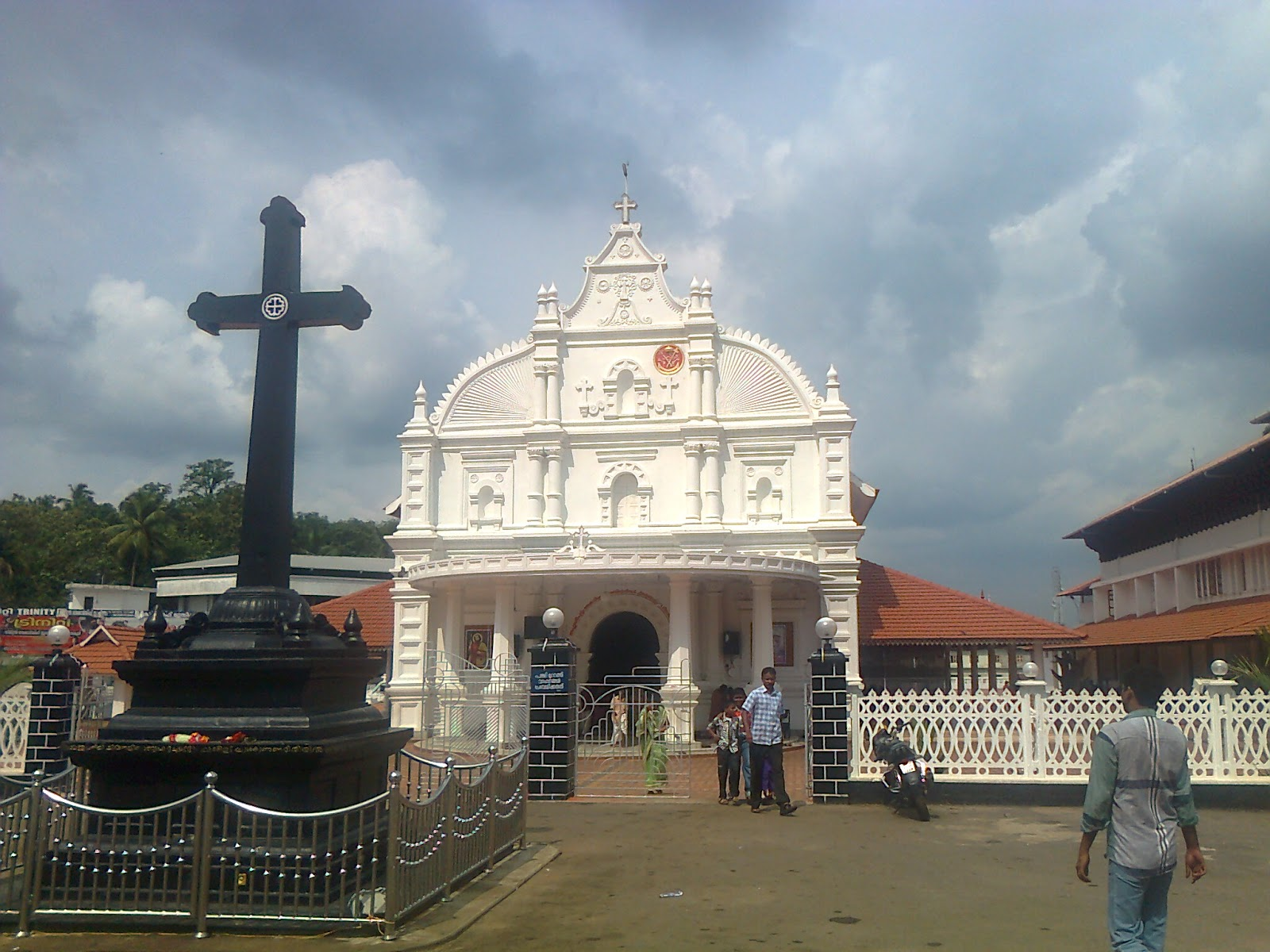
- Main façade of Marthoma Jacobite Syrian Orthodox Cheriyapally Kothamangalam
- Mar Thoma Jacobite Syrian Orthodox Church, Kothamangalam
- 10.0625°N 76.629°E
- Location: Kothamangalam, Ernakulam, India
- Denomination: Jacobite Syrian Christian Church
- Website: https://www.cheriapally.org

History
- Status: Major Church, Pilgrim

Architecture
- Style: Kerala Architecture
- Completed: 1455

Administration
- Province: Kothamangalam
- Diocese: Angamali

Clergy
- Archbishop: H.B. Baselios Joseph Catholicos

Mar Thoma Cheriyapally is a Jacobite Syrian Christian Church Church located in Kothamangalam town of Ernakulam district, Kerala, India. The church is believed to have been established in 1455 by 18 families who separated from Marth Maryam Valiyapally. The church is famous for the feast of Mor Baselios Yeldo, a Syriac Jacobite saint who preached in Kothamangalam. After his death, he was entombed in the altar room of this church. The church had witnessed many historic events of the Malankara.

== History ==
The present region of Kothamangalam was historically known as Malakhachira (മാലാഖച്ചിറ, which literally means "Place of the Angel"). According to church history, the Syriac Orthodox Bishop, St. Baselios Yeldo Maphrian reached the church in the year 1685, on 11th of Kanni month of the Malayalam calendar.

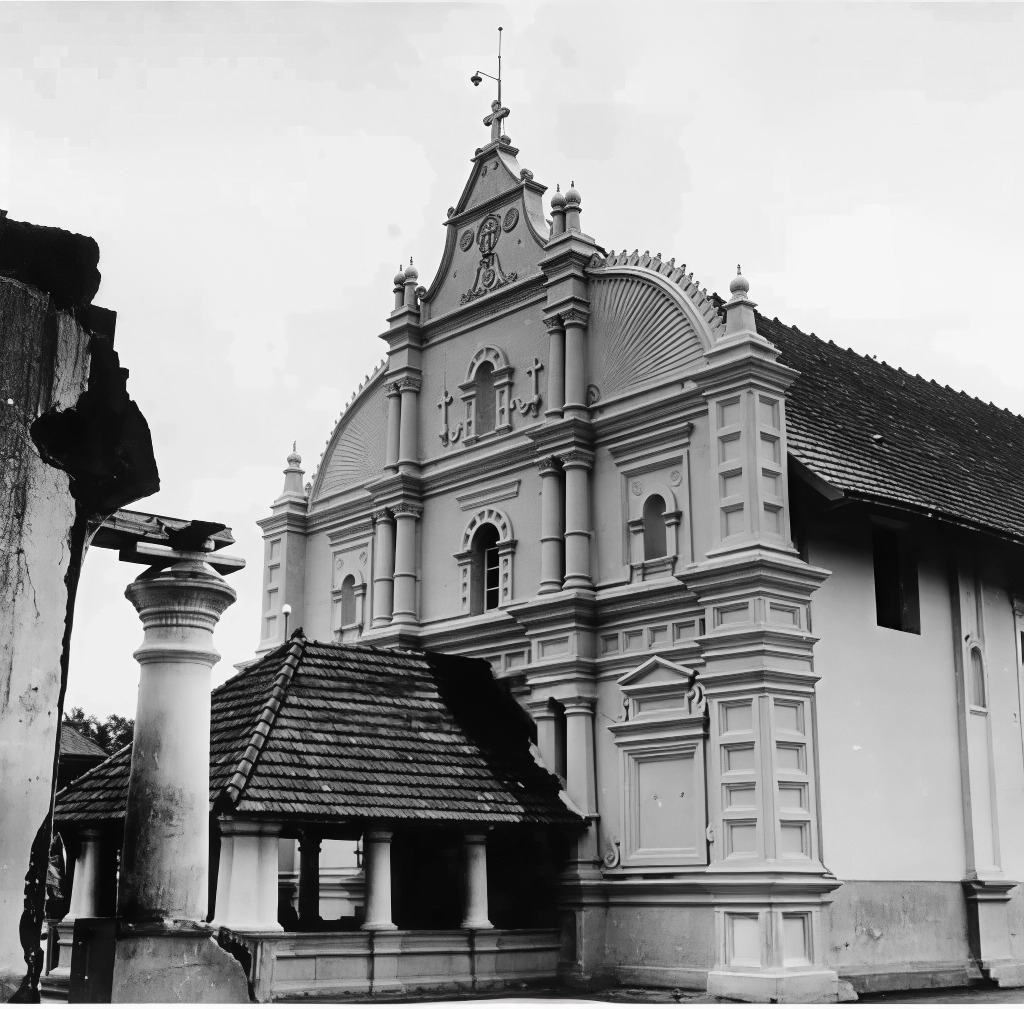
Front view of Church (Old photograph)

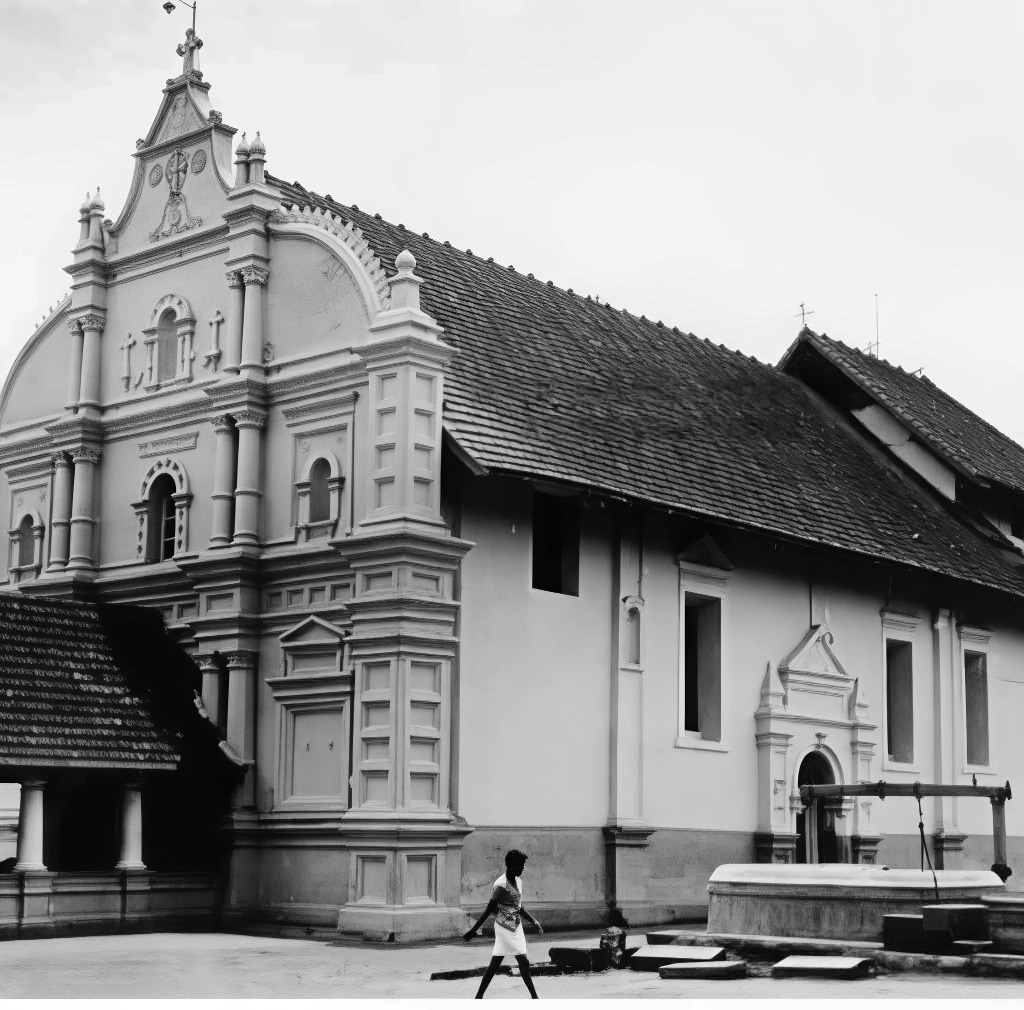
Side view of church and Well

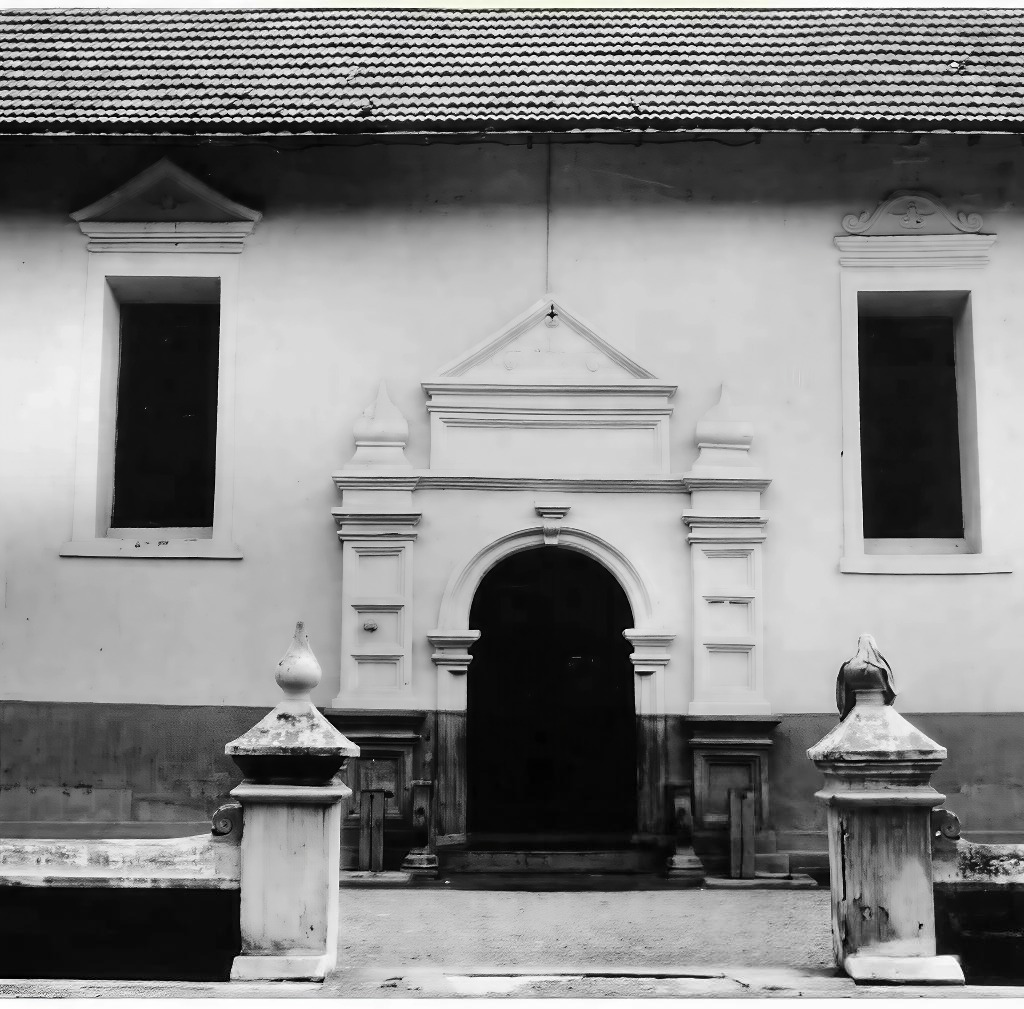
Church entry

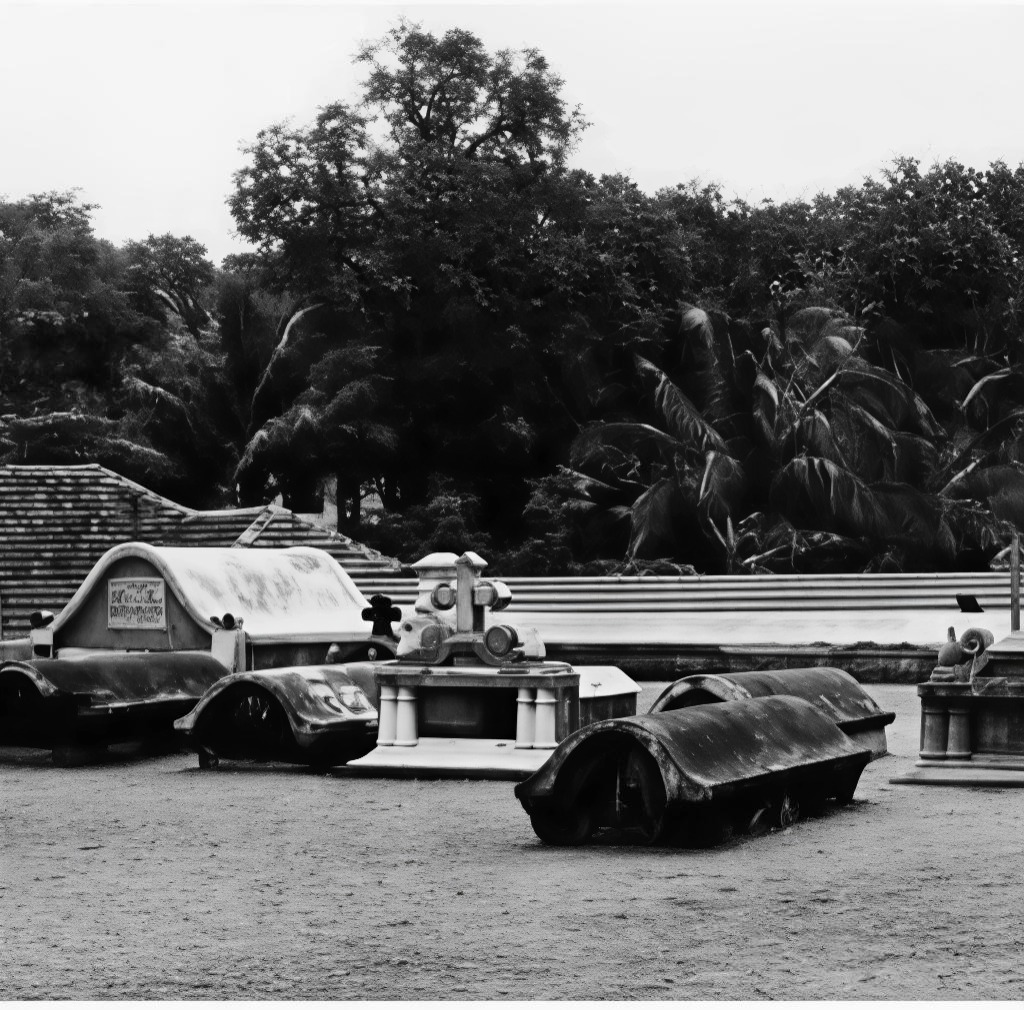
Cemetery

== Yeldo and Basil ==
The name Yelda (East Syriac) / Yeldo (West Syriac) means Christmas. Yelda/Yeldo lent (Nativity lent) starts 15 December till 25 December. Various spellings are used to write Yeldo (യെൽദൊ) in English (Yeldho, Eldho, Eldo).

Basil is the short form for Baselios, a Greek word that literally means "king" or "emperor", and is used to refer to St. Basil of Caesarea.

== Communal Harmony and Traditions ==
The church is notable for its long-standing tradition of communal harmony. During the state-wide protests against the Citizenship Amendment Act (CAA) in late 2019, the church authorities gained widespread media attention by opening the church premises to Muslim protesters to offer their evening prayers (Namaz).

Additionally, the church's annual feast (Dhukrono of Mar Baselios Yeldo) features participation from people across various religious communities. A traditional procession(Pradakshinam) associated with the festival is historically led by a member of a Hindu Nair family, who carries the ceremonial lamp ahead of the procession. Although, this tradition has been continuing more than three hundred years.

== The 2017 Supreme Court Verdict and the 'Second Coonan Cross Oath' ==
Following the 2017 Supreme Court of India verdict, which ruled that the 1934 Constitution of the Malankara Church was applicable to all parishes in the region, control of numerous churches historically held by the Jacobite Syrian Christian Church was legally transferred to the Malankara Orthodox Syrian Church.

In response to these developments and to resist any forced administrative merger, members of the Jacobite faction gathered at the Mar Thoma Cheriapally in Kothamangalam. In an act mimicking the historic 1653 Coonan Cross Oath, protestors tied ropes to the stone cross (Kalkurishu) outside the church and took a solemn vow to preserve their distinct ecclesiastical identity and allegiance to the Syriac Orthodox Patriarch of Antioch. This event is locally referred to by the Jacobite community as the "Second Coonan Cross Oath" (Randam Koonan Kurishu Sathyam).

=== 2017 Supreme Court Verdict and Ownership Standoff ===
Following the 2017 Supreme Court of India ruling that mandated the implementation of the 1934 Malankara Church Constitution across all constituent parishes, the Mar Thoma Cheriapally in Kothamangalam became a major flashpoint of contention between the Jacobite Syrian Christian Church and the Malankara Orthodox Syrian Church. When bishops and clergy of the Malankara Orthodox faction attempted to enter the church to assume administrative control, they faced intense physical resistance from local parishioners. Notably, the local Jacobite community received active solidarity from neighboring Hindu and Muslim residents, who joined the protests to prevent the administrative takeover of the historical church premises.

Citing the Kothamangalam Church case, the Central Government rejected the direct deployment of the Central Reserve Police Force (CRPF) for church disputes, stating that internal law and order is a state government responsibility.

The Left Democratic Front (LDF) State Government adopted a cautious approach during the standoff, choosing not to deploy heavy police force or measures such as tear gas on the premises of a place of worship, maintaining that forceful eviction would trigger severe law and order complications. However, this non-enforcement drew strong condemnation from the judiciary. On December 3, 2019, the Kerala High Court criticized the state government's stance, ruling that a large gathering of protestors or fears of popular resistance could not constitutionally justify failing to implement a court order. While higher courts had repeatedly directed district authorities to take physical possession of the shrine and transfer administration to the Orthodox vicar, ongoing local resistance and subsequent complex litigation kept the church under the active management of the Jacobite faction. On March 31, 2023, the Kothamangalam Munsiff Court formally dismissed a petition filed by an Orthodox Vicar seeking a permanent prohibitory injunction against the Jacobite clergy. While the court noted the overarching legal status of the Malankara Orthodox Church under the 1934 Constitution, it ultimately rejected the plaintiff's plea on the grounds that the Orthodox faction failed to prove they had ever established physical possession or actively assumed charge of the parish, thereby recognizing it as an independent constituent parish in terms of its ongoing immediate administration.

== Gallery ==
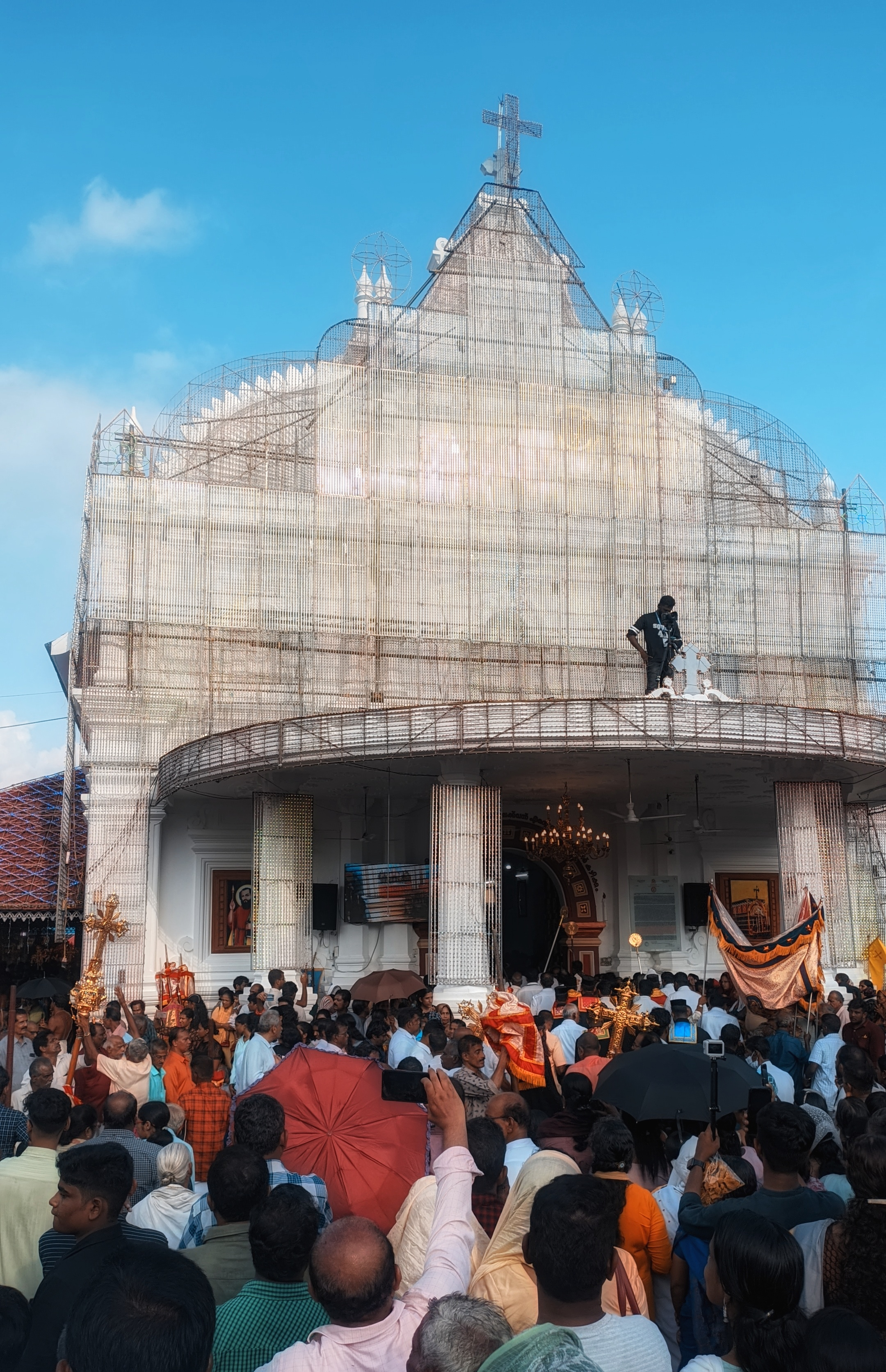
Kanni 20 Perunnal at Mar Thoma Jacobite Syrian Cheriapally, Kothamangalam

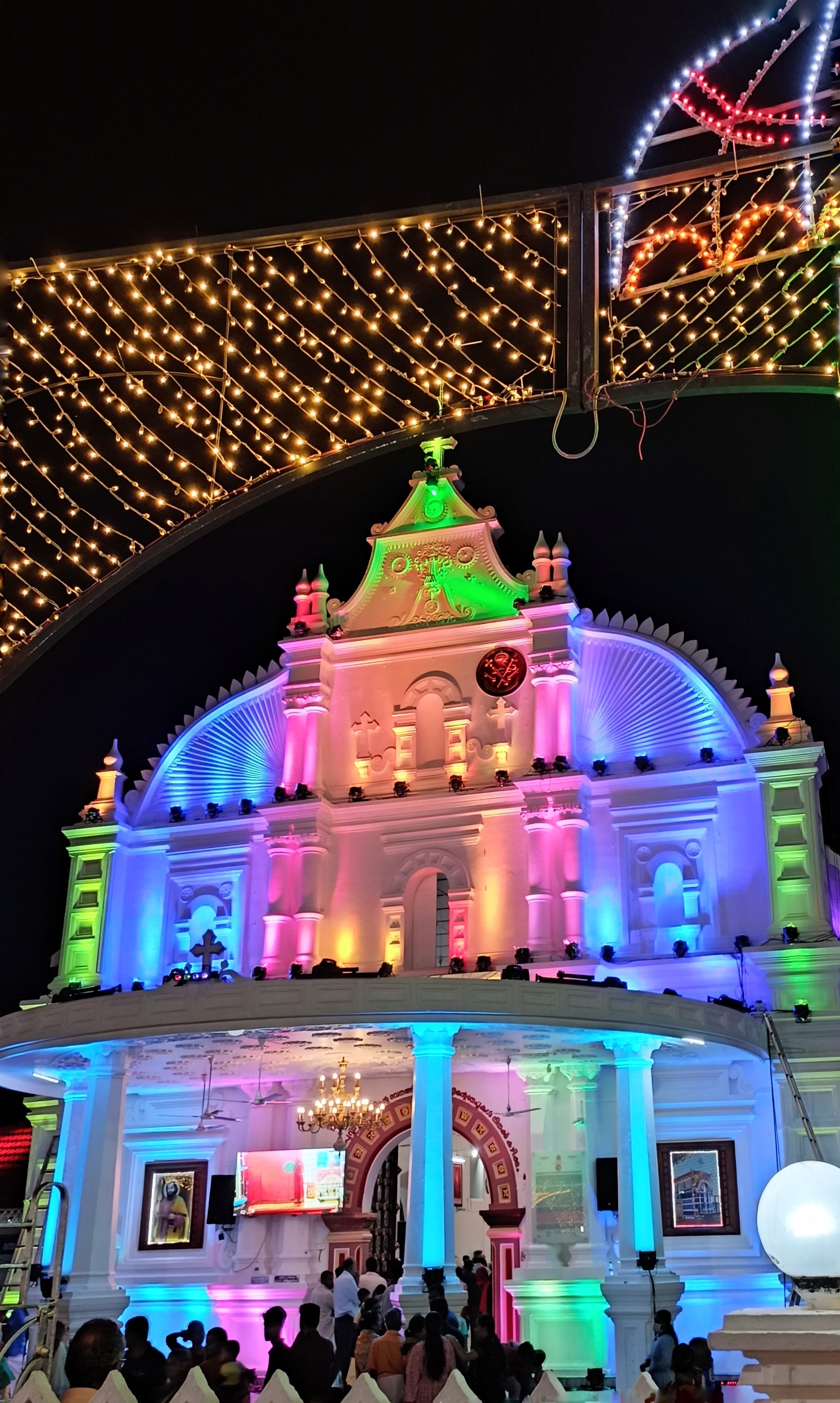
Kanni 20 Perunal Night At Mar Thoma Jacobite Syrian Cheriapally, Kothamangalam

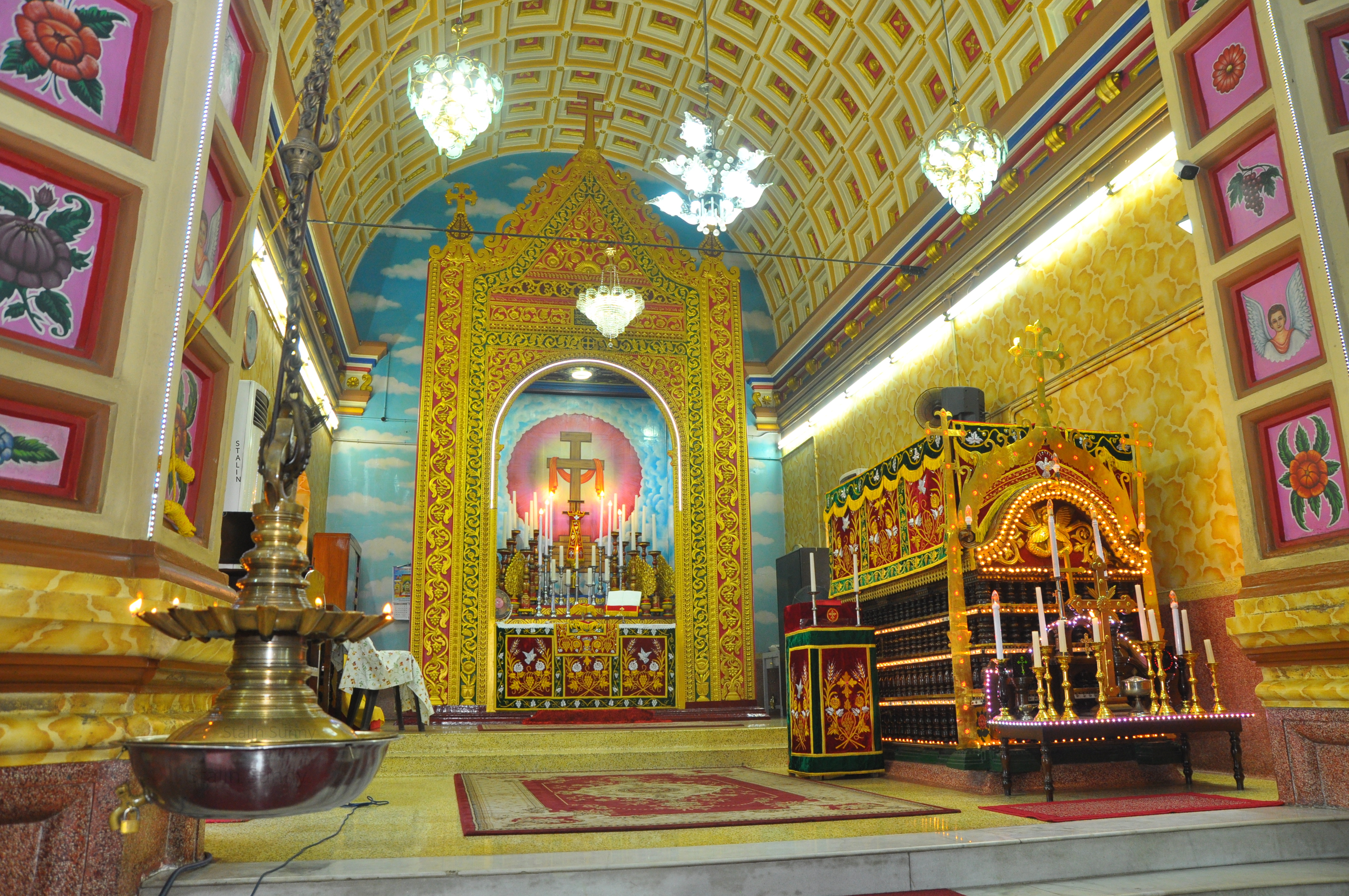
Main Madbaho (altar) and tomb of Mor Baselios Yeldho.

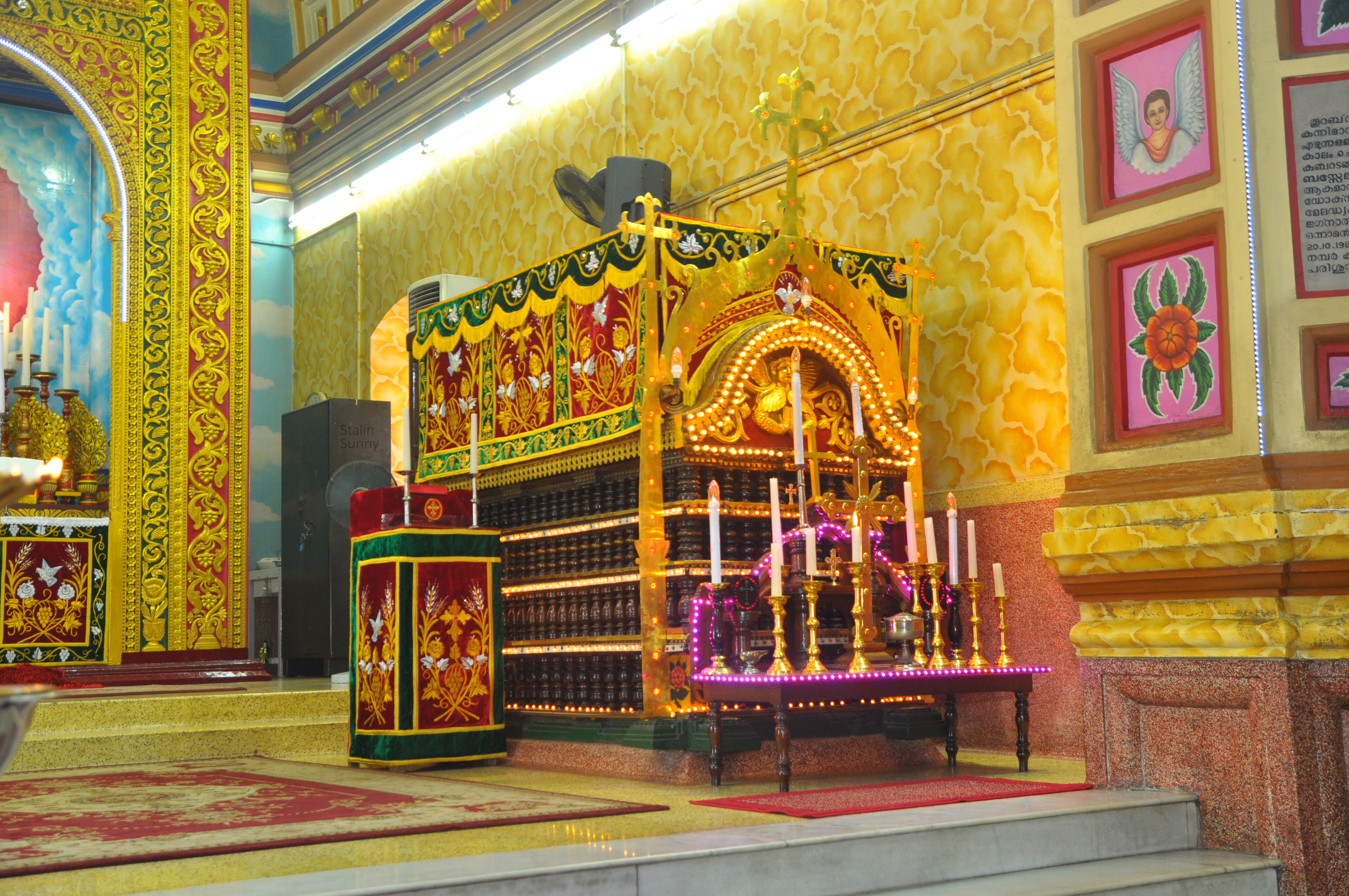
Tomb of Mor Baselios Yeldo

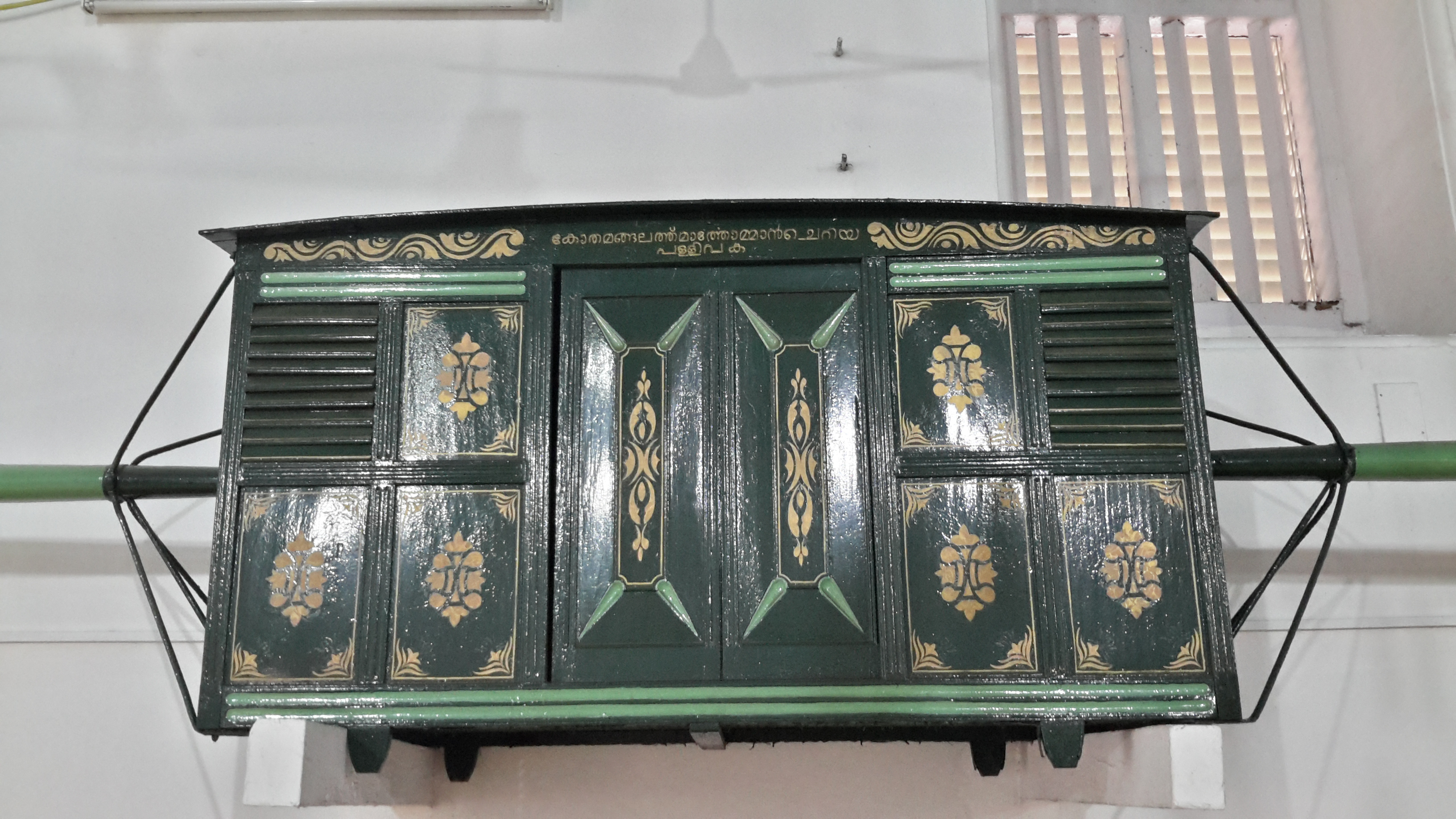
Manchal (Palanquin) used by Mor Baselios Yeldo.

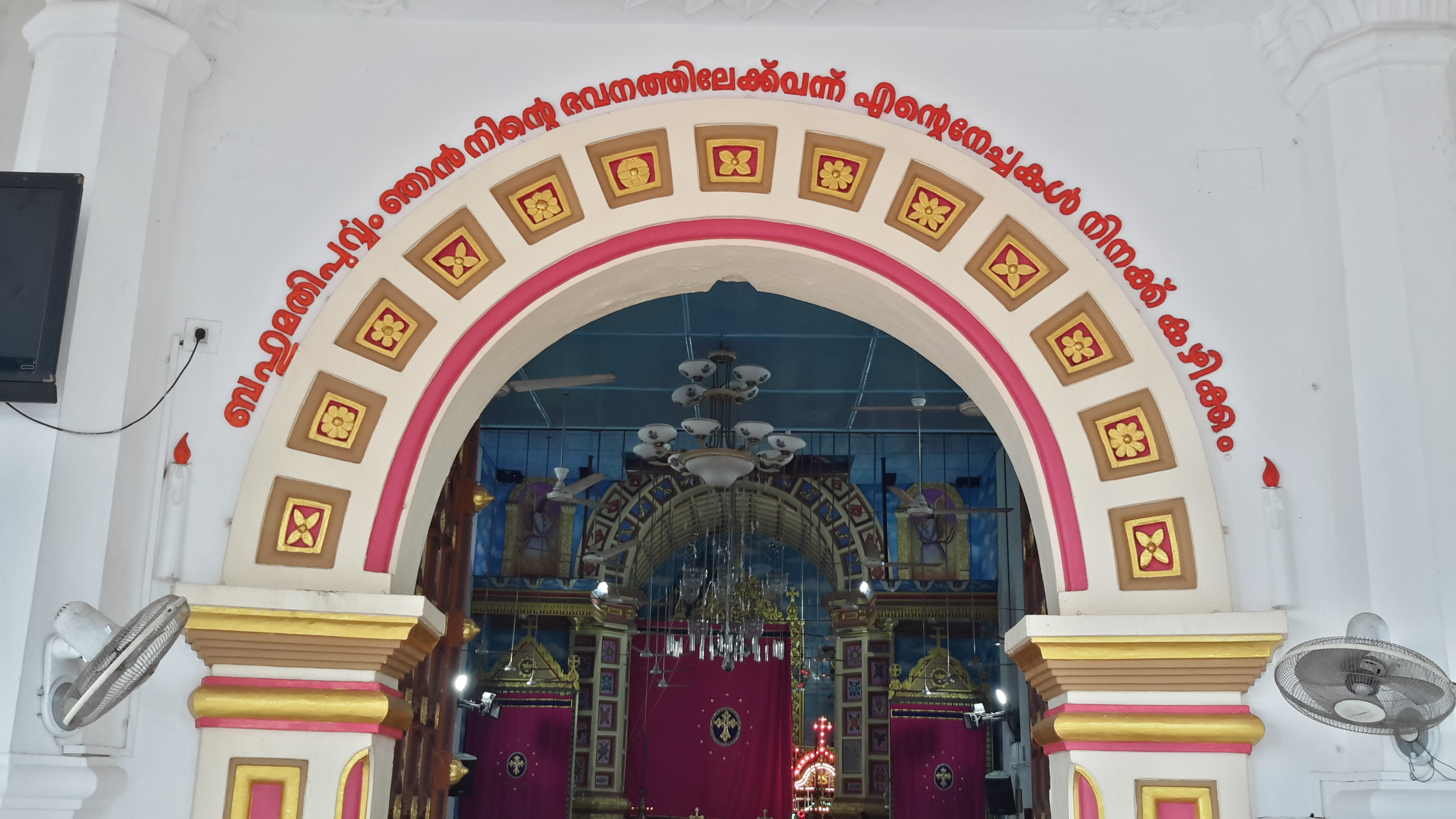
View from the Poomukham (front face) of the church.

== See also ==
- Baselios Yeldo
- Marth Mariam Valiyapally Kothamangalam
