= Athanasios Elias =

Syriac Orthodox bishop (born 1964)

His Eminence Dr. Mor Athanasios Elias
- Metropolitan
- Church: Jacobite Syrian Christian Church
- Diocese: Angamali Diocese
- See: High Range
- In office: 2007-

Orders
- Ordination: 15 August 1995 (Kassisso) by Thomas Dionysius
- Consecration: 1 January 2007 by Baselios Thomas I
- Rank: Metropolitan

Personal details
- Born: 11 February 1964 Angamaly
- Education: Doctor of Ministry (D.Min), Politics
- Alma mater: Mahatma Gandhi University, Kerala

Mor Athanasious Elias (born Eliyas on 11 February 1964) is a Syriac Orthodox bishop. As of 2012 he is the Metropolitan bishop of the Trichur diocese, the Patriarchal vicar of Singapore, President of the Antiochean Faith Movement in India and Vicar General of St. Athanasius Cathedral at the Puthencuriz.

== Early years ==
Athanasius Eliyas was born in the Kozhiparambath family of Thuruthisserry in Angamali, to Ittoop and Eliyamma (Kooranthazhathu Parambil family, Peechanickad) on 13 April 1964. The family belonged to the Akaparambu Mor Sabor Afroth church in Angamali diocese.

== Education ==
He was educated at the Nedumbassery Mar Athanasious School and received his college education at the Angamali DePaul College. He pursued theological studies under Ramban Geevarghese Karimbil (Metropolitan Dionysius Geevarghese) at Dayro d'Ignatius, Manjanikkara.

== Ordination ==
On 22 July 1988, Dionysius Thomas ordained him as a deacon (Korooyo), and on 15 January 1995 he was ordained as a priest (Kassisso). On 2 November 2002, Kassisso Eliyas was elevated to the order of Ramban (Dayroyo) by Catholicos Baselios Thomas I at the Mor Sabor Afroth church in Akaparambu. In November 2006 he was elected to the highest priestly order of the Metropolitan and the decision was later ratified by the Malankara Synod, Working Committee, Managing Committee, the Catholicos and the Patriarch. On Monday 1 January 2007, Catholicos Baselios Thomas I ordained Rabban Eliyas as Metropolitan Athanasious at the St. Athanasius Cathedral, Puthencuriz, in the presence of many religious and government dignitaries.

Athanasious was enthroned on 15 April 2007 at the Mor Sabor Mor Aphroth Church at Akaparambu. Baselios Thomas I was the chief celebrant and Metropolitans Gregorios Joseph and Chrysostmos Markose were the co-celebrants during the holy ceremony. Athanasious was appointed as the President of the Antiochean Movement in India and vicar-general of St. Athanasius Cathedral at Puthencuriz Patriarchal centre. The Malankara Episcopal Synod held in May 2007 gave him the additional charge of the Malankara Clergy Association.

== As a priest ==
As a priest, Athanasious served the churches at Vadattupara St. George Church, Aymuri St. Thomas Church, Neduvathoor St. George Church, Peechanikad Mount Tabor Church, Angamali St. Mary's Cathedral, Ernakulam St. Peter's Church and Thuruthissery Simhsana Church. For a brief period he had also served as the secretary of Metropolitan Dionysius Thomas.

== As a Metropolitan ==
Athanasious was appointed President of the Antiochean Movement in India and Vicar General of St. Athanasius Cathedral at the Puthencuriz Patriarchal Center. The Malankara Episcopal Synod, held in May 2007, gave him the additional responsibility of the Malankara Clergy Association. Athanasious also serves as President of the Malankara Evangelical Association, President of the Malankara Jacobite Syrian Sunday School Association, Manager of Mar Athanasious Upper Primary School, Thuruthissery, and Chairperson of the Women Welfare Institute under the Antiochean Movement at Thuruthissery.

== Responsibilities ==
As of 2012, Athanasious was

- President of Antiochean Faith Movement in India (Current)
- Chief Patron, Indian Christian Movement (ICM) (Current)
- Vicar General of the St. Athanasius Cathedral at the Puthencuriz, Church HQ, Kerala, INDIA (Current)
- President of Akhila Malankara Suvishesha Mahayogam (Current)
- Metropolitan of Thrissur Diocese of Jacobite Syrian Church (Current)
- Patriarchal Vicar of Singapore & Malaysia (Current)
- Past Patriarchal Vicar of State of Qatar (Past)
- President of the Malankara Clergy Association (Current)
- President of Malankara Evangelical Association (Current)
- President of Malankara Jacobite Syrian Sunday School Association, Aluva District (Past)
- Manager, Mar Athanasious U.P School, Thuruthissery, Kerala (Current)
- Chairperson, Women Welfare Institute, Thuruthissery, Kerala (Current)
- Patron, YMCA, Nedumbassery (Current)
- Founder Convenor of Nedumbassery Cochin International Airport

== Honors ==
1. Good Shepherd Award from Rotary International (2016)
2. Manava Seva Puraskaram (2015)
3. Order of St. Michael and Sir title from Teologiska Högskolan Västerbotten, Sweden (2013)
4. Doctor of Ministry (D.Min) Degree from Asia Pacific Institute for Theological Research, (2011)
5. Mother Teresa award (2010)
6. Best Manager Award (2003)

== See also ==
- Syriac Orthodox Church
- Jacobite Syrian Christian Church
