= Yulios Elias =

Syriac orthodox bishop (born 1971)

His Grace Mor Yulios Elias
- Metropolitan of Highrange and Kothamangalam regions of Angamaly Diocese
- Church: Jacobite Syrian Christian Church
- Diocese: Metropolitan of High range region of Angamali diocese
- See: Holy Apostolic See of Antioch & All East

Orders
- Consecration: 2 January 2012 by Baselios Thomas I
- Rank: Metropolitan

Personal details
- Born: August 18, 1971 India
- Denomination: Syriac Orthodox Church

Mor Yulios Elias (born 1971) is an Indian bishop. He is the Metropolitan of Adimali and Kothamangalam regions of Angamali Diocese of the Jacobite Syrian Christian Church. Mor Yulios Elias was consecrated metropolitan on 2 January 2012.

== Music albums ==
Mor Julius Elias worked on various devotional musical albums including Logama Gambeera song was featured in Krushumai Naadhan
