= Valiyapally =

Title for a main Indian Christian church

Valiyapally (Malayalam: വലിയ പള്ളി, "Principal church") is a title given to a main church in a diocese of the Christian denominations Malankara Orthodox Syrian Church, Malankara Mar Thoma Syrian Church,Jacobite Syrian Christian Church. It literally means "big church" in Malayalam.

For a church to be declared as a Valiyapally in these churches, it has to meet any of the following criteria:

1. Parent parish of 5 parishes in the Region
2. Have more than 500 families in the parish

== List of valiyapallys ==
=== Jacobite Syrian Christian Church ===
- St Mary's Jacobite Valiyapally, Thamarachal,
- St. Mary's Jacobite Syrian Valiyapally, Thuruthiply
- Mar Behanam Jacobite Syrian Valiyapally, Vengola
- Martha Mariam Cathedral (St. Mary's Jacobite Syrian Cathedral) Valiyapally, Kothamangalam
- St. Stephen's Bes Ania Valiyapally, Chelad
- St. Mary's Jacobite Valiyapally, Nedumon, Ezhamkulam
- St. Mary's Jacobite Syrian Orthodox Valiyapally, V.Kottayam
- St.George Jacobite Syrian Valiyapally Kunnackal
- Rajadhiraja St.Mary’s Jacobite Syiran Cathedral Valiyapally, Piravom
- St. John’s Jacobite Syrian Valiyapally, Mepral
- Mor Michael Jacobite Syrian Valiyaplly, Vettithara
- St. John’s Jacobite Syrian Valiyapally, Mulakkulam
- Mor Behanam Sahadha Jacobite Syrian Valiyaplly, Vengola
- St. Mary’s Jacobite Syrian Valiyapally, Kattachira

=== Malankara Mar Thoma Syrian Church ===
- Valakam Mar Thoma Valiyapally
- Thevalakkara Mar Thoma Valiyapally
- Pandanad Mar Thoma Valiyapally
- Kumbanad Mar Thoma Valiyapally
- Kaviyoor Mar Thoma Valiyapally
- Chengannur Mar Thoma Valiyapally
- Elanthur Mar Thoma Valiyapally

=== Malankara Orthodox Syrian Church ===
- St. Thomas Orthodox Syrian Church (Kundara valiyapally) Kundara, Kollam
- Immanuel Orthodox Valiyapally Nariyapuram, Pathanamthitta
- St. Mary's Orthodox Syrian Valiyapally, Niranam
- St. George Orthodox Syrian Valiyapally, Anchal
- St. Stephen's Orthodox Syrian Valiyapally, Kattanam
- St. George Orthodox Syrian Valiyapally, Kalanjoor
- St. Mary's Orthodox Syrian Valiyapally, Kalloopara
- St Mary's Orthodox Syrian Valiyapally, Perissery
- St Thomas Orthodox Syrian Valiyapally, Kallissery
- St. John's Orthodox Valiyapally, Ulanadu
- Rajadhiraja St. Mary's Syrian Orthodox Cathedral (Piravom Valiyapally)
- St. Andrew's Orthodox Valiyapally, Secunderabad
- St. Mary's Orthodox Syrian Church Valiyapally, Kallada (Shrine of St. Andrew of Kallada)
- St. George Orthodox Syrian Valiyapally Palarivattom
- St George Orthodox Syrian Valiyapally, Kizhmury
- St George Orthodox Syrian Valiyapally Puthupally (Puthupally church, the revered Shrine of St. George)
- St George Orthodox Valiayapally, Mylapra (Pilgrim Church)
- St George Orthodox Syrian Valiyapally, Chandanapally (Shrine of St. George)
- St John's Orthodox Valiyapally, Vakathanam
- St Philexinox Orthodox Valiyapally, Attachakal
- St George Orthodox Valiyapally, Pudupady(Kozhikode)
- St George Orthodox Valiyapally, Kelakom(Kannur)
- St. George Orthodox Valiyapally Chungathara (Malapuram)
- St George Orthodox Valiyapally, Mulakulam North, Piravom
- St. Mary's Orthodox Valiyapally, Prakkanam
- St. Mary's Orthodox Valiyapally, Ullannoor
- St. George Orthodox Valiyapally, Kanakappalam
- St Mathews Orthodox Valiyapally Kozhencherry
- St. Behanan's Orthodox Valiyapally Vennikulam
- St. Mary's Orthodox Valiyapally, Farmers Branch (Dallas), Texas, USA
- St. Thomas Orthodox Valiyapally, Kalyan (W)

==== Knanaya Syrian Orthodox ====
- St. Mary's Knanaya Valiyapally Kallissery

Official website for Kallissery Valiyapally

- St. George's Knanaya Valiyapally, Neelamperoor
- St. Jacob's Knanaya Syrian Valiya Pally, Ramamangalam
- Ranni St Thomas Knanaya Valiyapally

Official website for Ranni Valiyapally

- Kottayam Knanaya Valiyapally, Kottayam

Official website for Kottayam valiyapally
