= Anthimos Mathews =

Indian Syriac Orthodox bishop

His Grace Mor Dr. Anthimos Mathews Metropolitan of Angamaly Region, Patriarchal Vicar of Ireland
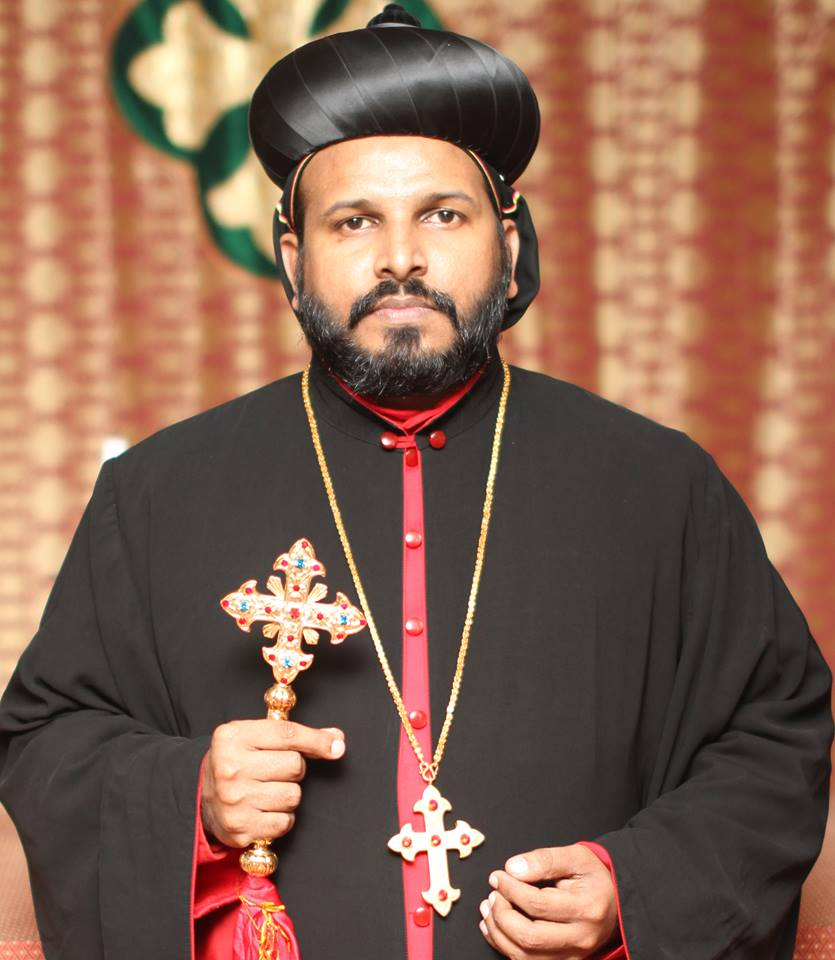
- Antheemos Mathews after the Church Mass
- Church: Jacobite Syrian Christian Church
- Diocese: Angamaly Diocese
- See: Angamaly Region
- Previous post: Muvattupuzha Region of Angamaly Diocese

Orders
- Ordination: 26 September 2005 (Kassisso) by Baselios Thomas I
- Consecration: 15 January 2012 by Patriarch Ignatius Zakka I
- Rank: Metropolitan

Personal details
- Born: November 3, 1974 (age 51) Aluva, Kochi, India
- Parents: Mr. C. M. Joseph & Mrs. Mary Joseph
- Education: D.Th Paris Lodron University, Salzburg, Austria, B.D (Bachelor of Divinity), United Theological College, Bangalore M.A Economics, Mahatma Gandhi University
- Alma mater: Paris Lodron University, University of Salzburg, Mahatma Gandhi University, Kerala

Mor Anthimos Mathews (born 3 November 1974) is a Syriac Orthodox bishop, currently Metropolitan of Angamaly Region of the Angamaly Diocese and the Patriarchal Vicar of Ireland.

== Education ==
Mathews Antheemos completed his Matriculation from Vidyadhiraja Vidya Bhavan Higher Secondary School, Aluva, Kerala. Later did his degree in B.A and M.A in Economics from Mahatma Gandhi University, Kerala, Kottayam and then joined the United Theological College, Bangalore, Karnataka, for a B.D. (Bachelor of Divinity). He received a Certificate in German Language from Ostkirchliches Institut, Regensburg, Germany. He has a Doctorate in Theology (D Th) from the Paris Lodron University, Salzburg, Austria in Patristic Theology – “Integrity of Creation in the Theology of Ephrem the Syrian. A Patristic Eco-theology” – guided by the Head of the Department of Biblical Studies and Ecclesiastical History Univ. Prof. Dr. Dietmar W. Winkler.

== Compositions ==
1. Sathya Viswasasamrakshakan CD/Cassettes 2003, (Released by Mor Athanasius Singers, Aluva)
2. The Lord Reigns CD 2004, (Released by Vox Dei, Aluva)
3. Voice of Christmas CD 2011, (Released by Vox Dei, Aluva)
4. Vishudha Mariyam CD 2017, (Released by Vox Dei, Aluva)
