= Angamali West Orthodox Diocese =

Angamali West is a diocese in India, belonging to the autocephalous Malankara Orthodox Syrian Church.

The present diocesan head is Bishop Yuhanon Mar Policarpus, who took charge in February 2009.

== Churches ==
Angamali West diocese has only a few churches and these have small congregations. The largest church is Kunnakkurudy St. George Cathedral.

Churches that form Angamaly-West Diocese of Malankara Orthodox Syrian Church, which have been obtained mainly after court orders -

- Aluva College Hill St. Thomas Church
- Ankamaly Mar Gregorios Church
- Chathamattom Carmel St. Peter's & St. Paul's Church
- Eloor Mar Gregorios Church
- Kodanadu Sehion Church
- Kunnakurudy St. George Cathedral
- Pothanikadu Umminikunnu St. Mary's Maha Edavka Church
