= Malankara Syrian Orthodox Seminary =

- Udayagiri St Ephrem Seminary

Location
- Ernakulam, Kerala; India
- Coordinates: 9.9146°N 76.4281°E

Information
- Type: seminary
- Established: 1990
- Founder: Very Rev Adai Jacob Cor Episcopa
- President: Mor Theophilus Kuriakose
- Rector: Rev.Fr. Michael Ramban
- Principal: Very Rev. Adai Jacob Cor Episcopa
- Chaplain: Fr. Biju PM

Malankara Syrian Orthodox Theological Seminary is a theological seminary for the Jacobite Syrian orthodox Church at Mulanthuruthy, Ernakulam in India. Opened in 1990, the seminary buildings are clustered on Udayagiri hill in the village of Vettickal.

== See also ==
Thrikkunnathu Seminary
