= Malankara Syrian Orthodox Diocese of Angamaly =

Malankara Syriac Orthodox Diocese of Angamaly മലങ്കര സുറിയാനി ഓർത്തഡോക്സ് അങ്കമാലി ഭദ്രാസനം

Location
- Country: India
- Ecclesiastical Province: Angamaly, Perumbavoor, High Range, Muvattupuzha, Kothamangalam

Leadership
- Patriarch: Ignatius Aphrem II
- Metropolitan: Baselios Joseph, Catholicos of India
- Bishops: Aphrem Mathews; Yulios Elias; Anthimos Mathews; Athanasios Elias; Gregorios Gabriel
- Bishop Emeritus: Severios Abraham

History
- Established: 1876
- First Hierarch: Athanasius Paulose Kadavil I

Information
- Denomination: Oriental Orthodox
- Church: Syriac Orthodox Church
- Maphrianate: Jacobite Syrian Christian Church
- Rite: West Syriac rite
- Calendar: Gregorian Calendar
- Languages: Classical Syriac , Malayalam
- Cathedral: St. Mary's Soonoro Cathedral, Angamaly
- Metropolitan Residence: Mount Sinai Aramana
- Headquarters: Thrikunnathu Seminary

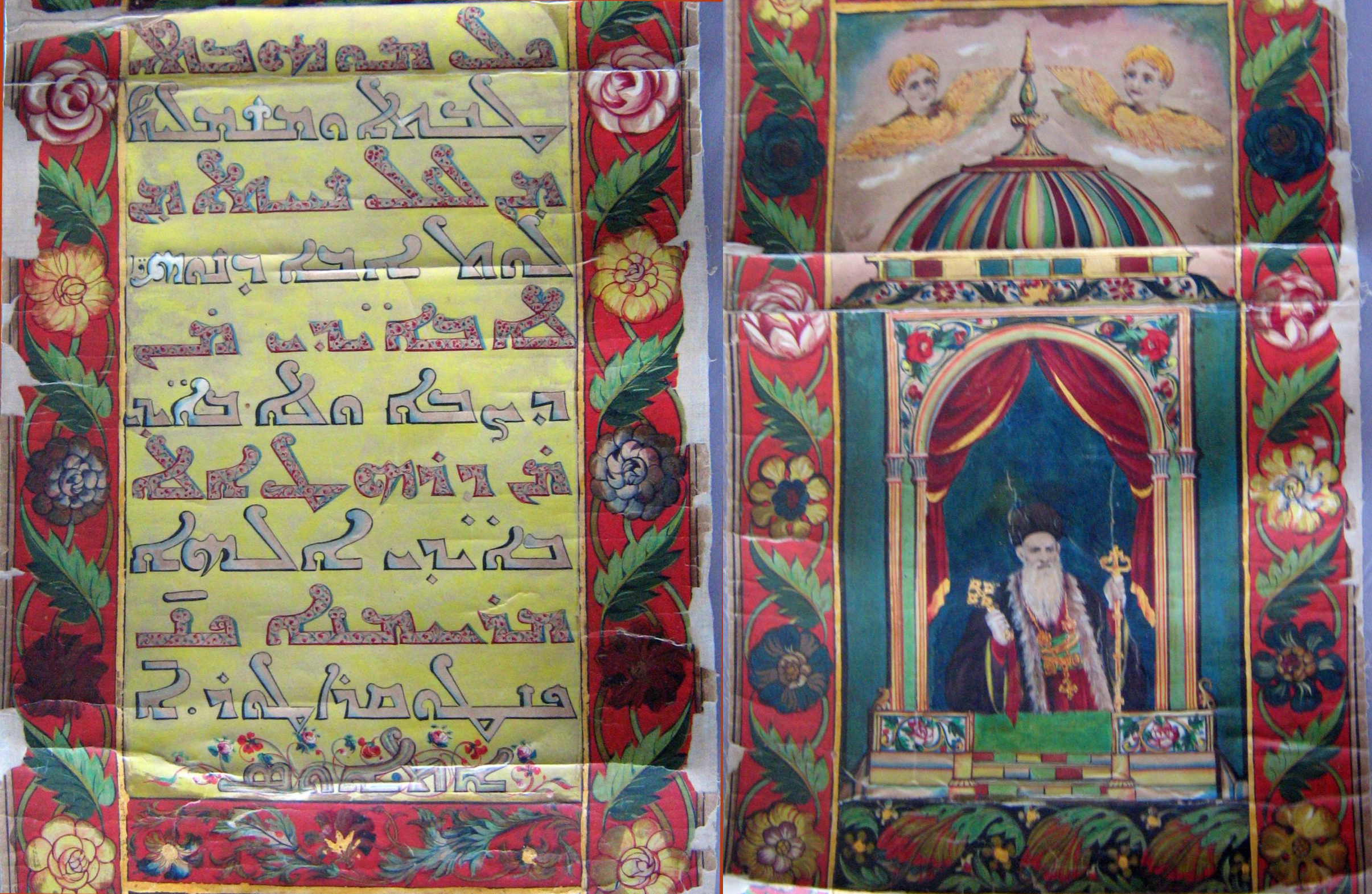
Sthathicon of the first Metropolitan of Angamali, Kadavil Paulose Mar Athanasius

Angamali Diocese is the largest of the 12 dioceses of Syriac Orthodox Church in Kerala. Angamali Diocese was formed in the historic Synod of Mulanthuruthy in 1876 and has been a major center of Jacobites through the ages. The Metropolitan of the Diocese is the Catholicos of India, currently Mor Baselios Joseph.

== Regions ==
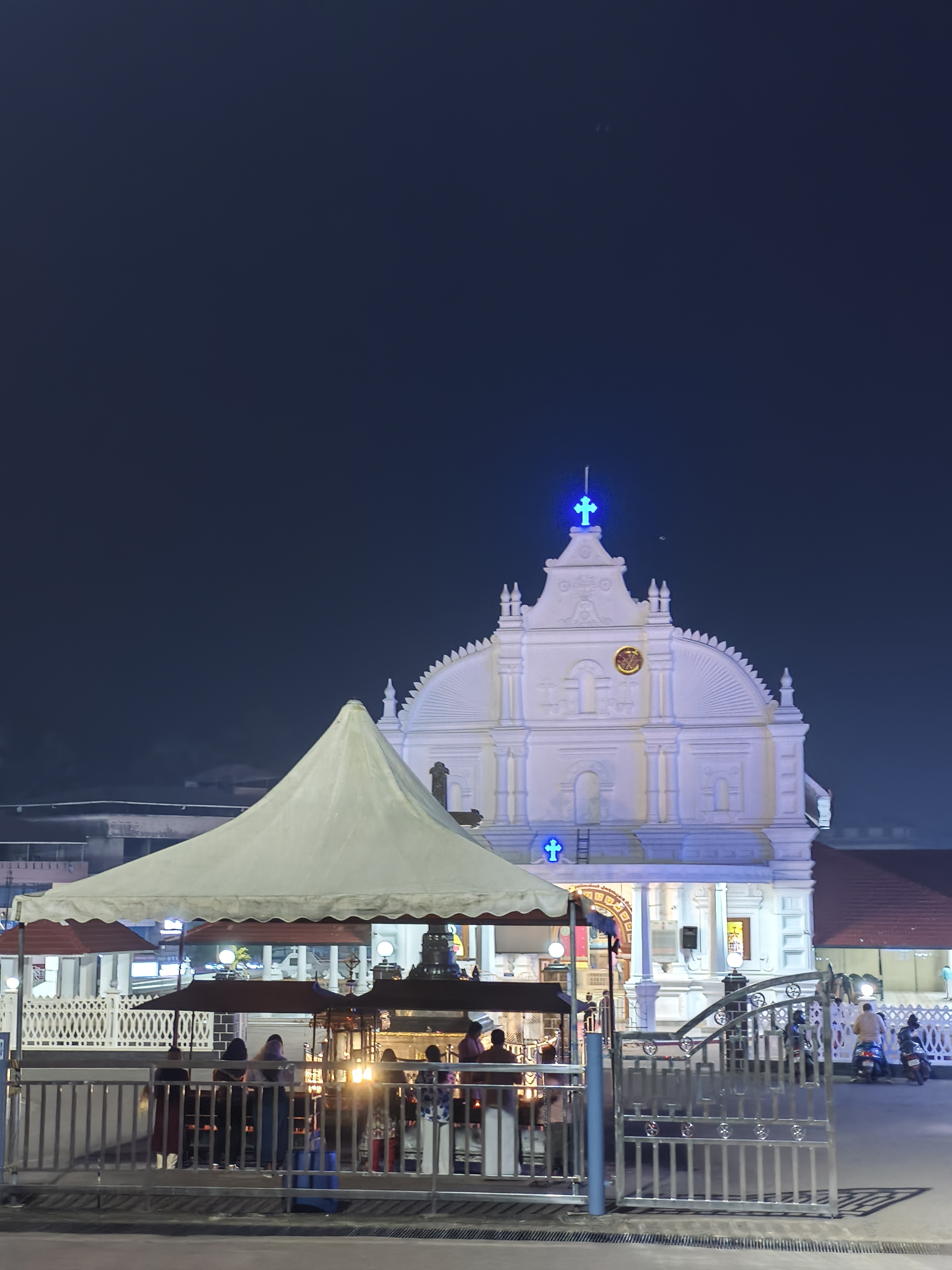
Night View of Marthoman Cheriya Pally, Kothamangalam

Angamali Diocese is divided into five regions for administrative purposes under different Bishops. In addition to these, Mor Severios Abraham, is titularly recognized as the Great Metropolitan of the Angamaly Diocese.

=== Angamaly ===
Angamali Zone

Location
- Metropolitan: Mathews Mor Anthimos
- Headquarters: Thrikkunathu Seminary

Information
- Cathedral: St. Mary's Soonoro Cathedral, Angamaly

Bishop: Mor Anthimos Mathews

This region consists of 52 parishes, including St Thomas Church North Paravur (Tomb of St Gregorios Abdul Jaleel), Thamarachal Valiyapally-Marian Pilgrim Centre, Angamaly St Mary's Sonoro Cathedral, Pallikkara Malecruz St Thomas Church – Global St Thomas Pilgrim Centre.

=== Perumbavoor ===
Bishop: Mor Aphrem Mathews

Perumbavoor Zone

Location
- Metropolitan: Mor Aphrem Mathews
- Headquarters: Koinonia Bishop House, Vengola

Information
- Cathedral: St. Mary's Cathedral, Kurupampady (Largest Parish in Malankara)

The region has 43 parishes, including Mazhuvanoor St Thomas Cathedral, Kurupampady St. Mary's Cathedral, Vengoor Mar Kauma Church, Thuruthiply St Mary's Church.

=== Kothamangalam ===
Bishop: Mor Yulios Elias

Kothamangalam Zone

Location
- Metropolitan: Mor Yulios Elias
- Headquarters: Catholicate Aramana – Mount Sinai, Kothamangalam

Information
- Cathedral: Martha Mariyam Cathedral (Valiyapally), Kothmangalam

This region is called the Stronghold of Jacobites with 48 churches and most of them big parishes, including Martha Mariyam Cathedral Kothamangalam (Valiyapally) established in AD 456, Mar Thoma Cheriayapally Kothmangalam (Tomb of St Baselious Yeldho), Chelad Bes Aniya Valiyapally, Kottapady Kalkunnel church, and Kottapady Nagancherry church.

High Range Zone

Location
- Metropolitan: Athanasios Elias
- Headquarters: Metropolitan Aramana, Adimali

Information
- Cathedral: Cathedral of Saint George, Adimali

=== Highrange ===
Bishop: Mor Athanasius Elias

This is the largest region in terms of area as it covers regions of Angamali diocese falling in Idukki district. There are 34 parishes in the region. Major parishes are St. George Cathedral Adimali, St John's Church Rajakumari, St George church muruckumthotty, Koompanpara St. George Church, 14th mile Ignatius Noorono Church.

=== Muvattupuzha ===
Bishop: Mor Gregorios Gabriel

Muvatupuzha Zone

Location
- Metropolitan: Mor Anthimos Mathews
- Headquarters: Metropolitan Aramana, Muvatupuzha

Information
- Cathedral: St. Mary's Cathedral, Karakunnam

This region has 37 parishes, including St. Mary's Cathedral Karakkunnam, Rakkad Cathedral, and Kadathy St. Peter's and St. Paul's church. St. Mary's Jacobite Syrian church Mullaringadu

== Sunday School ==
The 257 Sunday schools in the diocese are divided into three zones and 23 districts.

District	Diocese Region	Zone	Number of Sunday Schools
Angamali	Angamali	Angamali West	16
Aluva	Angamali	Angamali West	15
Pukkattupady	Angamali	Angamali West	8
Pallikkara	Angamali	Angamali West	18
North Paravur	Angamali	Angamali West	5
Malayidomthuruthu	Perumbavoor	Angamali West	8
Thuruthiply	Perumbavoor	Angamali West	8
Vengoor	Perumbavoor	Angamali Central	8
Kuruppumpady	Perumbavoor	Angamali Central	9
Perumbavoor	Perumbavoor	Angamali Central	8
Keezhillam	Perumbavoor	Angamali Central	8
Krariyeli	Perumbavoor	Angamali Central	10
Chelad	Kothamangalam	Angamali Central	14
Kottapady	Kothamangalam	Angamali Central	15
Kothamangalam	Kothamangalam	Angamali East	19
Kavalangadu	Kothamangalam	Angamali East	9
Kunnakurudy	Perumbavoor	Angamali West	10
Muvattupuzha West	Muvattupuzha	Angamali Central	14
Muvattupuzha East	Muvattupuzha	Angamali East	16
Valara	Highrange	Angamali East	4
Rajakumary	Highrange	Angamali East	11
Adimali	Highrange	Angamali East	17
Kambalikandam	Highrange	Angamali East	7

Region-wise
Angamali Region – 62
Perumbavoor Region – 59
Kothamangalam Region – 57
Muvattupuzha Region – 40
Highrange Region – 39

Zone-wise
West Zone – 88
Central Zone – 86
East Zone – 83

== Jacobite Syrian Orthodox Youth Association ==
This is the youth wing of Jacobite Syrian church. Diocese Secretary: Paul Kooran

Sl No	Region	Priest Vice President	Secretary	No of Units
1	Adimali	–	–	34
2	Angamaly	–	Saju Parakkadan	52
3	Kothamangalam	–	Basil Chelad	48
4	Muvattupuzha	–	–	37
5	Perumbavoor	–	–	43

== Mor Gregorios Jacobite Students Movement ==
Mor Gregorios Jacobite Students Movement is the student wing of Jacobite church started in 1922 at Cheruthottukunnel St. George church in Angamali Region of Angamali Diocese by St. Athanasius of Aluva. MGJSM in Angamali Diocese is divided into six regions

- Spiritual Director: Rev Fr George Vayaliparambil
- Diocesan Coordinator: Shinil Thuruthummel
- Committee Members
1. Godly
2. Jinson
3. Eldho Madathumpady
4. Eldho Karukapilly
5. Maria Paul
6. Aby Mathew
7. Joseph Peter
8. Fima Joy
9. Ebin Eldho
10. Belby Benny
11. Albin Aleyas
12. Ankith Sabu
13. Leeba Benny
14. Jobin
15. Boney

Sl No	Region	Spiritual Advisor	Coordinator	Secretary	No of Units
1	Adimali	Fr Babu	Jobin	Boney	17
2	Angamaly	Fr George Vayaliparambil	Godly	Jinson	23
3	Kothamangalam	Fr Baby John	Ebin Eldhose	Belby Benny	18
4	Muvattupuzha	Fr Kuriakose Maniyattu	Albin Aleyas	Ankith Sabu	18
5	Pallikkara	Fr Babu Varghese	Eldho Madathumpady	Eldho Jacob Karukapilly	20
6	Perumbavoor	Fr Varghese Mannarampil	Aby Mathew	Joseph Peter	18

== List of Metropolitans ==
	Name	Sworn in	End of term
1	Mor Athanasius Paulose Kadavil	1876	1907
2	Mor Dionysius Joseph II Pulikoottil	1907	1909
3	Mor Athanasius Paulose of Aluva	1910	1953
4	Mor Gregorious Geevarghese Vayaliparambil	1953	1966
5	Mor Theophilose Phillipose	1966	1974
6	Mor Baselios Thomas I	1974	2024
7	Mor Baselios Joseph	2024	Present

== Statistics ==
Parishes: 214 (including Independent Chapels:37) Priests: 294
