= Athanasius Paulose Kadavil =

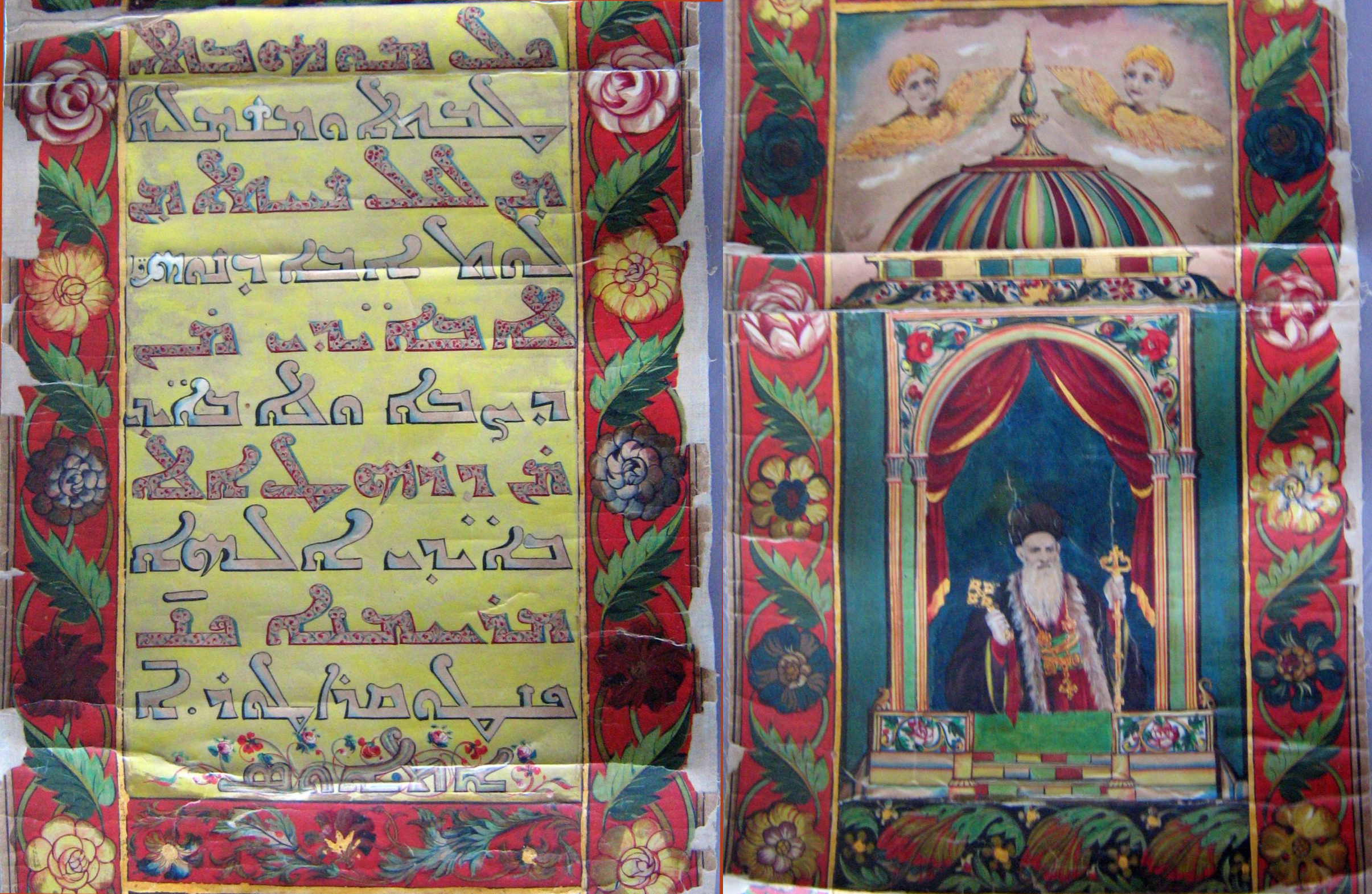
The Sthathicon of Kadavil Paulose Mar Athanasius, 1877

Mor Athanasius Paulose Kadavil became the First Metropolitan of Angamaly Diocese of Malankara Church for the diocese of Kottayam in 1876.
