= Baselios Joseph =

Catholicos of the Malankara Jacobite Syriac Orthodox Church

His Beatitude Aboon Mor ശ്രേഷ്ഠ Baselios Joseph ܡܳܪܝ̱ ܒܰܣܺܝܠܺܝܳܘܣ ܝܰܘܣܶܦ݂ ബസേലിയോസ് ജോസഫ്
- Catholicos of India
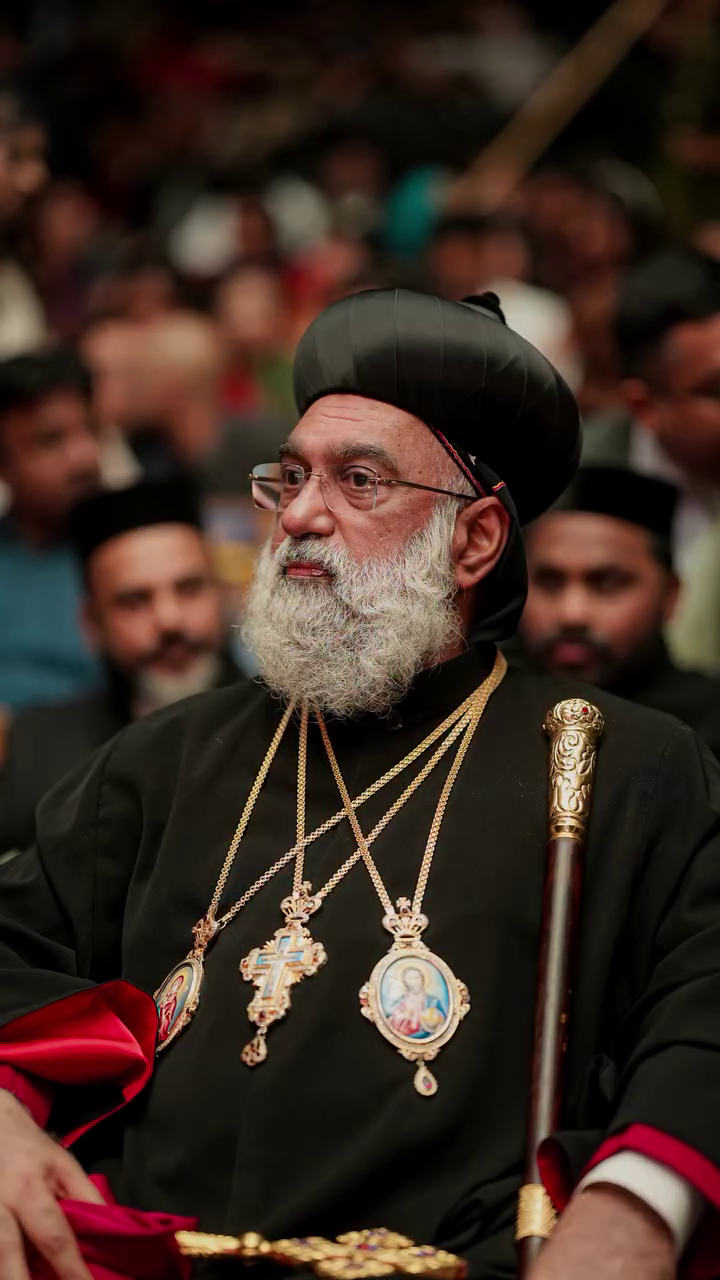
- Official Portrait, 2025
- Native name: ശ്രേഷ്ഠ ബസേലിയോസ് ജോസഫ് ബാവ
- Church: Syriac Orthodox Church
- See: Catholicate See
- In office: 2025-Present
- Predecessor: Baselios Thomas I
- Other posts: Malankara Metropolitan, Metropolitan of Kochi Diocese, Metropolitan of Angamali Diocese

Orders
- Ordination: 25 March 1984 by Baselios Paulose II, Catholicos of the East
- Consecration: 16 January 1994 by Ignatius Zakka I, Patriarch of Antioch

Personal details
- Born: Joseph "Jose" Pallithitta; November 10, 1960 (age 65) Mulanthuruthy, Kochi, Kerala
- Denomination: Oriental Orthodox
- Residence: Kyomtha Seminary,(Catholicos Residence) Thiruvankulam
- Parents: Srambikkal Pallithitta Geevarghese and Saramma
- Education: M.Phil. from Trinity College Dublin, B.D from St Patrick's College, Dublin, Ireland, B.A Economics from Maharaja's College, Ernakulam, Diploma in Clinical Pastoral Education and Counseling, U.S.A Theological Studies from Mor Julios Seminary, Perumpilly
- Alma mater: Trinity College Dublin, Ireland, Mahatma Gandhi University, Kerala
- Coat of arms

Mor Baselios Joseph as Metropolitan

Mor Baselios Joseph (Syr: ܡܳܪܝ̱ ܒܰܣܺܝܠܺܝܳܘܣ ܝܰܘܣܶܦ݂; Mal: മോർ ബസേലിയോസ് ജോസഫ്; Born 10 November 1960) is the current Catholicos of India of the Jacobite Syrian Christian Church. He also serves as the Metropolitan of the Kochi Diocese and Angamali Diocese.

He was elevated to the position of Catholicos on March 25, 2025 at St. Mary's Cathedral, Atchaneh, Lebanon in a service presided by Ignatius Aphrem II, the Syriac Orthodox Patriarch of Antioch.

== Early years ==
Joseph "Jose" Pallithitta was born in Perumpilly, Kerala as the youngest of four children to Srambikkal Pallithitta Geevarghese and Saramma on 10 November, 1960. Joseph had his primary education at Perumpilly Primary School and his high school education from Mulanthuruthy High School.

== Early service ==
On 25 March 1974, at the age of 13, Joseph was ordained a deacon by Mor Gregorios Geevarghese of Perumpally at Mor Ignatius Dayro, Manjinikkara. He later served as the secretary to Mor Gregorios for several years. He pursued pre-degree and undergraduate studies at Maharaja's College, Ernakulam, before joining Mor Julius Seminary, Perumpally, for theological studies.

On 25 March 1984, Joseph was ordained a priest at Marthoman Church, Mulanthuruthy, by Mor Baselios Paulose II. He went on to earn a master's degree in philosophy from Trinity College, Dublin, and pursued further theological studies in the United States, where he also served as the vicar of multiple churches. He was ordained as Dayroyo by Ignatius Zakka I Iwas in Damascus on 15 January 1994.

== Metropolitan ==
On 16 January 1994, Fr. Joseph Ramban was consecrated as Mor Gregorios Joseph, the Metropolitan of the Kochi Diocese, by Ignatius Zakka I Iwas, the Patriarch of Antioch and All the East, at Damascus. He formally assumed the office after the Sunthroniso (enthronement) ceremony at Kyomtha Cathedral, Thiruvankulam, on 23 January 1994.

Joseph served as the President of the Malankara Jacobite Syrian Sunday School Association (MJSSA) from 1996 to 2002. He was also instrumental in initiating several orphanages and educational projects. In 2019, he was elected as the Metropolitan Trustee of the Jacobite Syrian Christian Association, following the resignation of Catholicos Baselios Thomas I from administrative duties.

In 2023, Patriarch Ignatius Aphrem II appointed him as the 26th Malankara Metropolitan of the Jacobite Syrian Christian Church. He also served as Catholicos Assistant to Baselios Thomas I until his passing in 2024.

== Catholicos of India ==
Following the death of Baselios Thomas I, Gregorios Joseph was unanimously elected as the Catholicos of India. He was elevated as Catholicos of India in a service led by Patriarch Ignatius Aphrem II alongside all the bishops of the Syriac Orthodox Church on 25 March 2025, at St. Mary's Cathedral, Atchaneh, Lebanon with the name Baselios Joseph. He was enthroned on 30 March 2025, at Mar Athanasius Cathedral, Puthencruz. He became the 81st Maphrian of the East and 4th Catholicos of India.

Malankara Syriac Orthodox Church Titles
Preceded by Baselios Thomas I 2002-2024	Catholicos of India; 2025 - Present	Succeeded by Incumbent
Preceded by Baselios Thomas I 2004-2019	Malankara Metropolitan of Jacobite Syrian Christian Church; 2019 - Present	Succeeded by Incumbent
