= Baselios Thomas I =

Indian Syriac Orthodox prelate (1929–2024)

His Beatitude Aboon Mor Baselios Thomas I Yacub burdhono d'malankara
- Catholicos of India
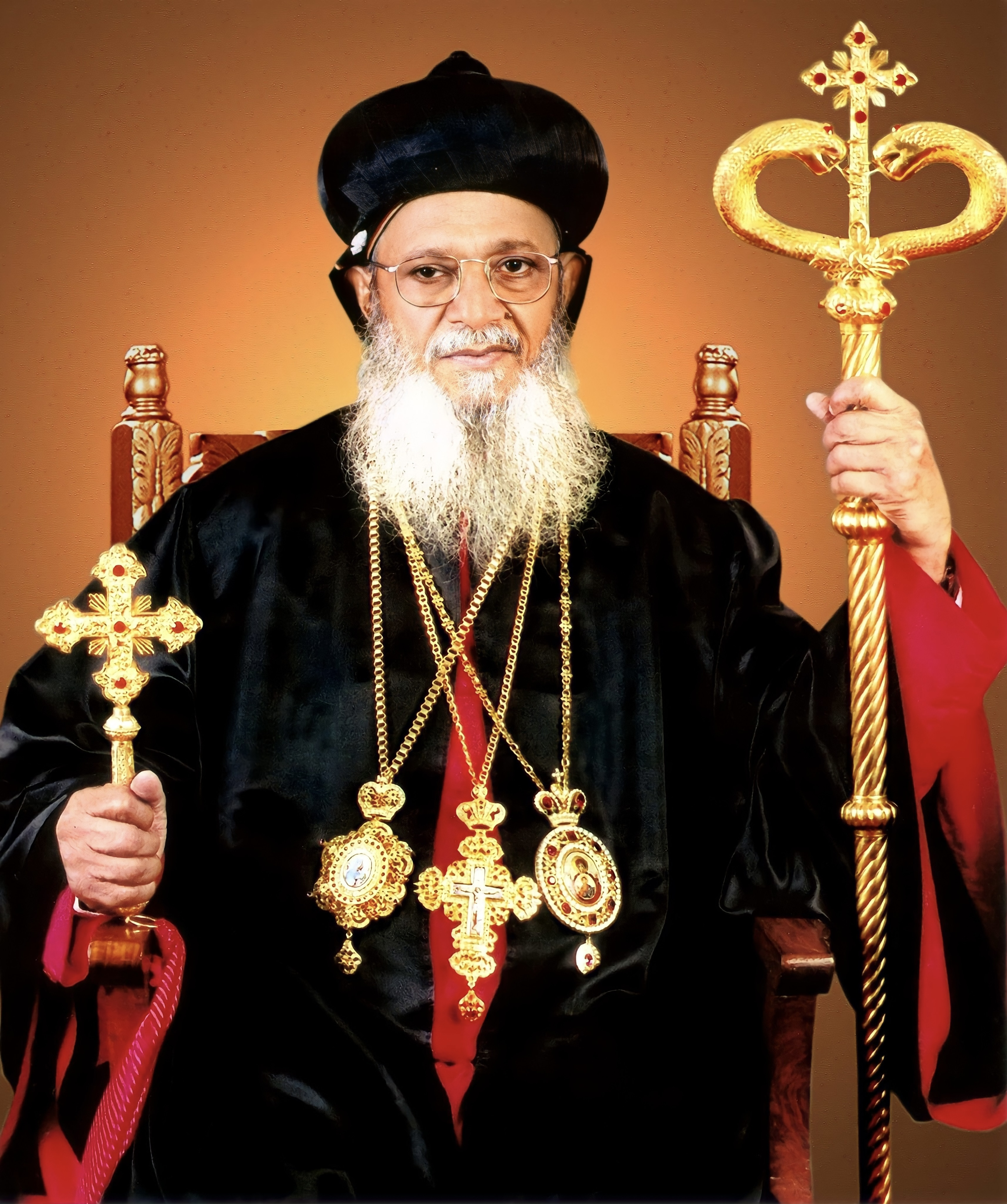
- Native name: ശ്രേഷ്ഠ ബസേലിയോസ് തോമസ് പ്രഥമൻ ബാവ
- Church: Syriac Orthodox Church
- See: Malankara Syriac Orthodox Church
- In office: 2002 - 2024
- Predecessor: Baselios Paulose II
- Successor: Baselios Joseph
- Other posts: Malankara Metropolitan, Metropolitan of Angamali Diocese

Orders
- Ordination: 21 September 1958 by Julius Elias Qoro
- Consecration: 24 February 1974 by Ignatius Yaqub III

Personal details
- Born: 22 July 1929 Puthencruz, Travancore, India
- Died: 31 October 2024 (aged 95) Kochi, Kerala, India
- Buried: St. Athanasius Cathedral, Puthencruz
- Denomination: Oriental Orthodox

Sainthood
- Attributes: Jacob Barradeus of Malankara; Bar Regesh

Mor Baselios Thomas I (Syr: ܡܳܪܝ̱ ܒܰܣܺܝܠܺܝܳܘܣ ܬܐܳܘܡܰܐ ܩܰܕ݂ܡܳܝܳܐ; Mal: മോർ ബസേലിയോസ് തോമസ് പ്രഥമൻ; Born Cheruvillil Mathai Thomas (22 July 1929 – 31 October 2024) was the 80th Maphrian of the Syriac Orthodox Church, 3rd Catholicos of East and 25th Malankara Metropolitan of the Jacobite Syrian Christian Church. He also served as the Metropolitan of the Angamali Diocese. He was the first head of the Jacobite Syrian Christian Church to use the title "Catholicos of India".

Enthroned on 26 July 2002 by Patriarch Ignatius Zakka I Iwas at St. Ephrem's Monastery in Damascus, Syria, he led the church through periods of ecclesiastical and social challenge until his death in 2024.

== Early life ==
Cheruvillil Mathai Thomas, affectionately known as "Kunjunju," was born on 22 July 1929 to Cheruvillil Mathai and Kunjamma. Though he came from an aristocratic family, financial hardship marked his childhood. Frequent illnesses interrupted his education, leading his mother to pray at the relics of St. Cyricus, St. Ignatius Elias III, and St. Gregorios of Parumala at Malecruz Dayro. Due to financial constraints, he left school after the fourth grade and began working as a mail runner with the postal department. Thomas received spiritual training under figures like Njarthunkal Koruthu Malpan, Moosa Saloma Ramban, and Kadavil Paul Ramban.

== Early service ==
In 1952, Thomas was ordained a lector, becoming a deacon in 1957 under Mor Philexenos Paulose, and a priest in 1958 under Mor Julius Elias Qoro. Serving as vicar of St. Peter's and St. Paul's Church in Puthenkurish, he later ministered in communities including Vellathooval, Kezhumuri, Fort Cochin, Valamboor, Calcutta, and Thrissur. From 1967 to 1974, he worked as organizing secretary for Kolenchery Medical Mission Hospital, later serving in missions across northern India. He also supported coal miners in Calcutta through his work at Varikoly Hospital. Known as a gifted orator and biblical scholar, Thomas's impact extended across spiritual, social, and medical spheres.

== Metropolitan ==
In 1973, the Angamali Diocese Church Association elected Thomas as its metropolitan. Consecrated as Mor Dionysius Thomas alongside Mor Gregorios Geevarghese of Perumpally in 1974 by Patriarch Ignatius Yacoub III, the new bishops were called to rally the community during the renewed conflict between the Syriac Orthodox Church and the Malankara Orthodox Syrian Church. For their efforts they were called "Bar Regesh" or "Sons of Thunder". In 1978, Mor Dionysius founded Mor Baselios Medical Mission Hospital in Kothamangalam, Kolenchery Medical Mission Hospital and lot of other institutions. Following Mor Baselios Paulose II’s and Mor Gregorios's deaths, Mor Dionysius became President of the Malankara Synod in 2000, and he played a pivotal role in organizing an association meeting in 2002 to establish a new constitution for the Malankara Jacobite Syrian Church, where he was elected Malankara Metropolitan and Catholicos.

== Catholicos of India ==
In 2002, Mor Dionysius Thomas was enthroned as Catholicos of India, taking the name Baselios Thomas I. During his leadership, he restructured the Angamali diocese into five regions and established new dioceses in Delhi, Bombay, Bangalore, Mylapore, and Idukki. He presided over the consecration of 13 bishops and participated in numerous other consecrations presided by the Patriarch of Antioch. He also presided over the enthronement of Mor Ignatius Aphrem II as Patriarch of Antioch in 2014. He founded St. Thomas Meditation Center in Kizhillam, St. Paul's Mission Center in Pattimatam, and St. John's Mission Center for Orphans in Kothamangalam, as well as educational institutions such as St. Thomas College in Puthencruz. He also established the churches headquarters, the Patriarchal Centre in Puthencruz, Kochi, in 2004. For his efforts in reviving the Church—work that mirrored the historic restoration of St. Jacob Baradaeus—he was honored with the title "Jacob Baradaeus of Malankara."

A prominent figure in ecumenical dialogue, Mor Baselios Thomas I held discussions with the Roman Catholic Church and the Mar Thoma Syrian Church, maintaining friendships with figures like Joseph Mar Thoma, Cardinal Baselios Cleemis, and Cardinal George Alenchery. He participated in meetings with both Pope Francis and Pope John Paul II and took a leading role in protests opposing court orders favoring the Malankara Orthodox Syrian Church.

In 2019, he stepped down from his administrative role as Malankara Metropolitan but remained Catholicos at the request of Patriarch Ignatius Aphrem II, with Mor Gregorios Joseph succeeding him as Malankara Metropolitan.

== Death ==
Mor Baselios Thomas I died on 31 October 2024 at a medical facility in Kochi, at the age of 95, following a prolonged battle with age-related health issues. He was entombed at St. Athanasius Cathedral at the Patriarchal Centre, Puthencruz, Ernakulam on 2 November 2024.

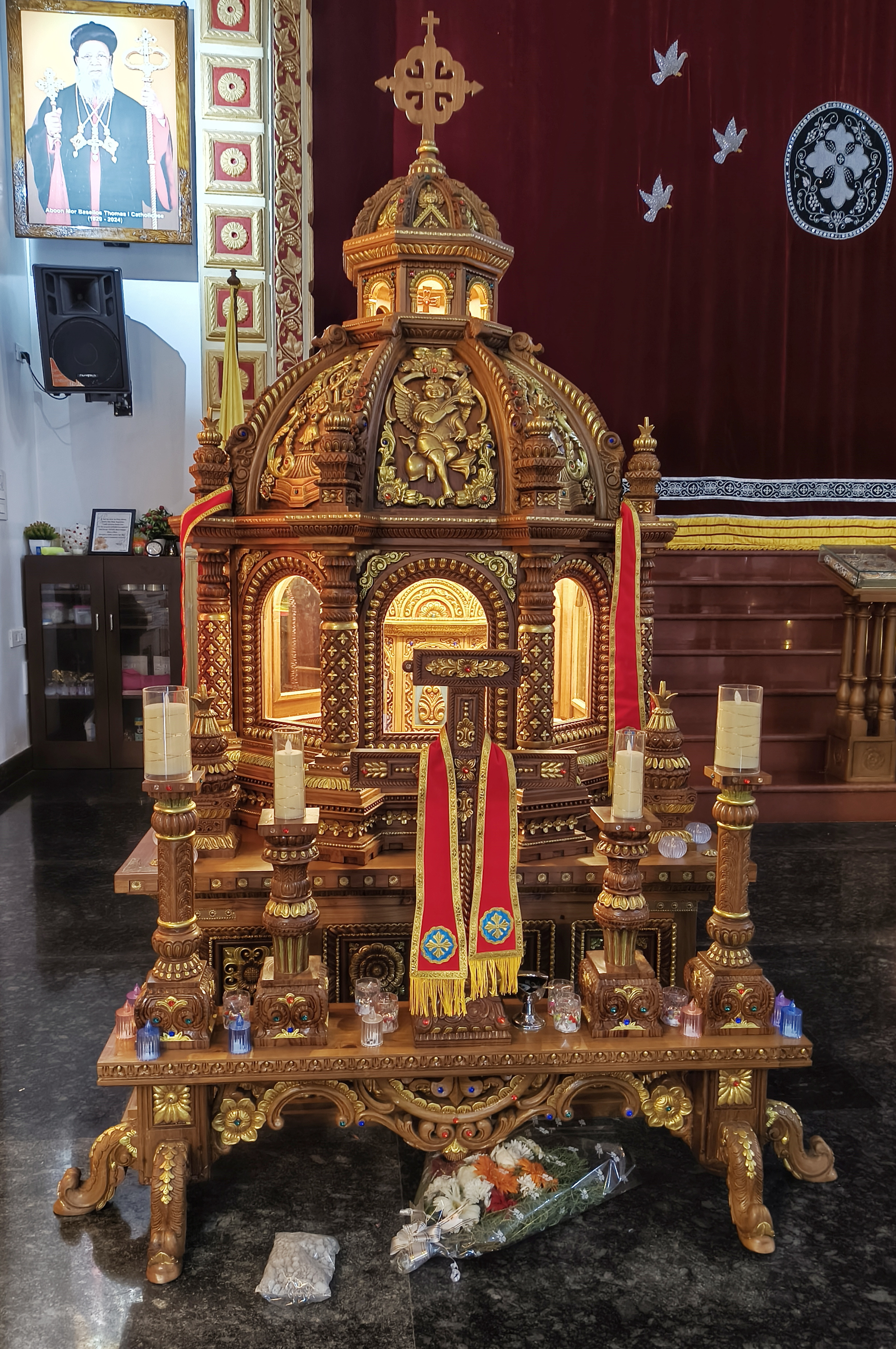

'Malankara Syriac Orthodox Church Titles
Preceded by Baselios Paulose II; 1975-1996	Catholicos of India; 2002–2024	Succeeded by Baselios Joseph; 2025-Present
Preceded by Yuhanon Philoxenos; 1999-2002	Malankara Metropolitan of Malankara Jacobite Syrian Christian Church; 2002–2019	Succeeded by Baselios Joseph; 2019-Present
