= St. George's Monastery, Malekurish =

Syriac Orthodox Monastery in India

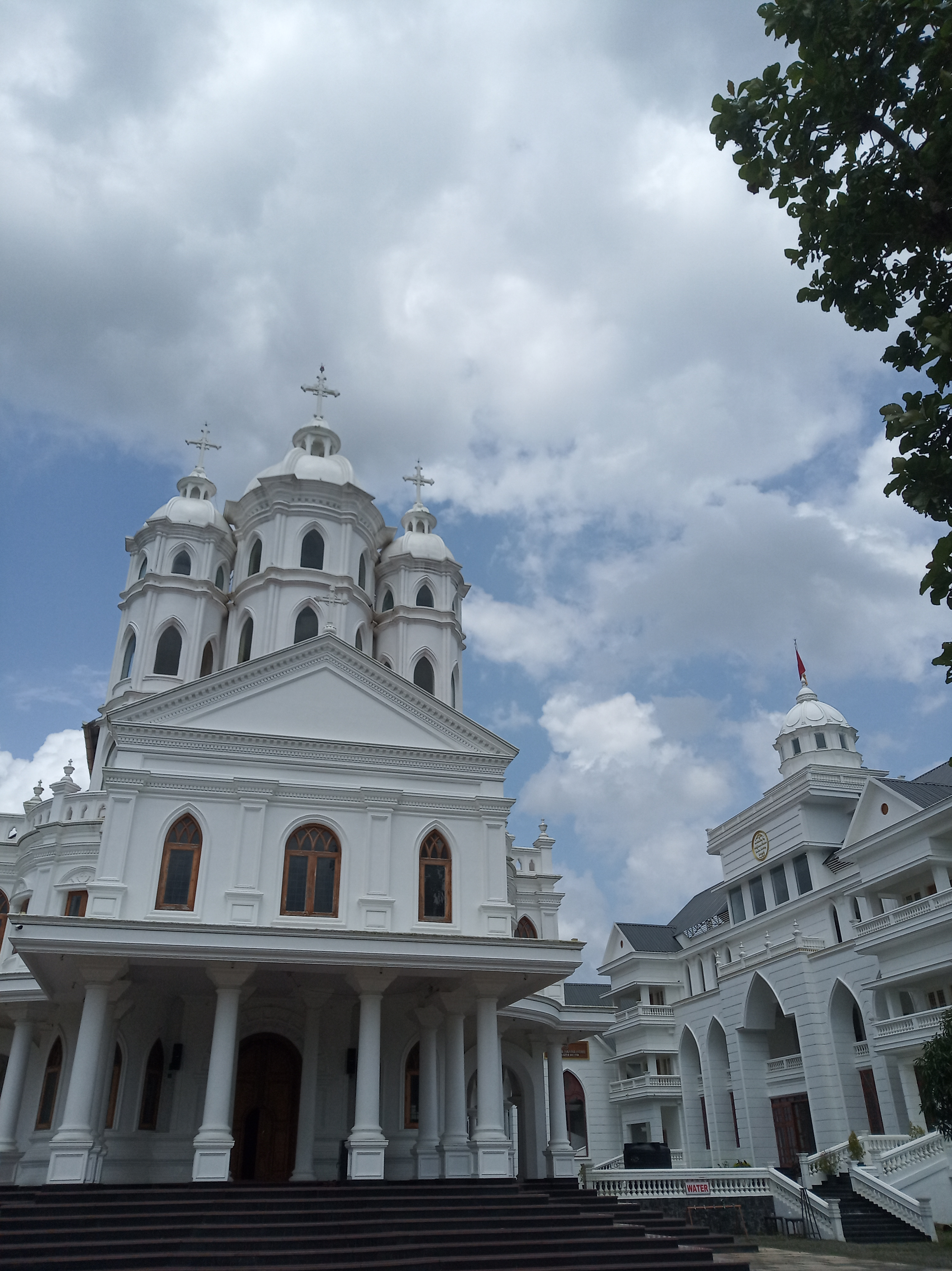
- St. George's Syrian Orthodox Monastery, Malekurish

Religion
- Affiliation: Syriac Orthodox Church of Antioch
- District: Ernakulam
- Province: Kerala
- Ecclesiastical or organizational status: Cathedral

Location
- Location: Puthencruz, Ernakulam, India

Architecture
- Type: Church

St. George's Monastery is a Syriac Orthodox Monastery (Dayro) situated at a hilltop near Puthencruz, Ernakulam District, Kerala. The monastery was established by Mor Yulius Elias Qoro (Patriarchal delegate to Malankara). The Malankara Syrian Orthodox Seminary began functioning in this monastery and later moved to Udayagiri. The monastery is the final resting place of Catholicos Baselios Paulose II. In 2019, a retreat house named Khanema Hanna Home was consecrated by Ignatius Aphrem II Patriarch near to the Monastery. The present Abbot of Malekurish Dayro is Mor Dioscorus Kuriakose.

== Relics in the Monastery ==
- St. George - the saint renowned throughout the world as the crown of Christian martyrs.
- Kaumo - known as an earthly angel who was a Stylite (monk meditating on a pillar in a standing posture).
- Kuriakose Sahado - infant martyr of unmatched glory who received martyrdom at the very tender age of three along with his mother Morth Yulithy(Julitta).
- Geevarghese Gregorios of Parumala (Parumala Kochu Thirumeni) - the saint of Parumala who was consecrated metropolitan at the young age of 28 and who lived a saintly life and is venerated by Syriac Orthodox Church and Malankara Orthodox Syrian Church. The Tomb is situated at St. Peter and St. Paul's Church, Parumala.
- Ignatius Elias III - the Patriarch of Antioch who arrived to bring peace in the Church in Malankara, entombed at St. Ignatius Monastery Manjinikkara.
- Osthatheos Sleeba - apostolic delegate of the Patriarch of Antioch in India during the turbulent period in the Church during the first quarter of the last century - entombed in the St.Mary's Simhasana church at Arthat, Kunnamkulam.

== Tomb ==
- Baselios Paulose II, Catholicose and Maphrian of the Jacobite Syrian Christian Church, known as "The Tower of Light", is entombed in this church.
- Phinehas Ramban, Ascetic and monk under the Syriac Orthodox monastic order is entombed in the church premise. He was decorated as "Dayaro Nasheeho" (Illustrious Monk) by the Patriarch Ignatius Zakka I of the Syriac Orthodox Church of Antioch and was commonly considered a living saint.

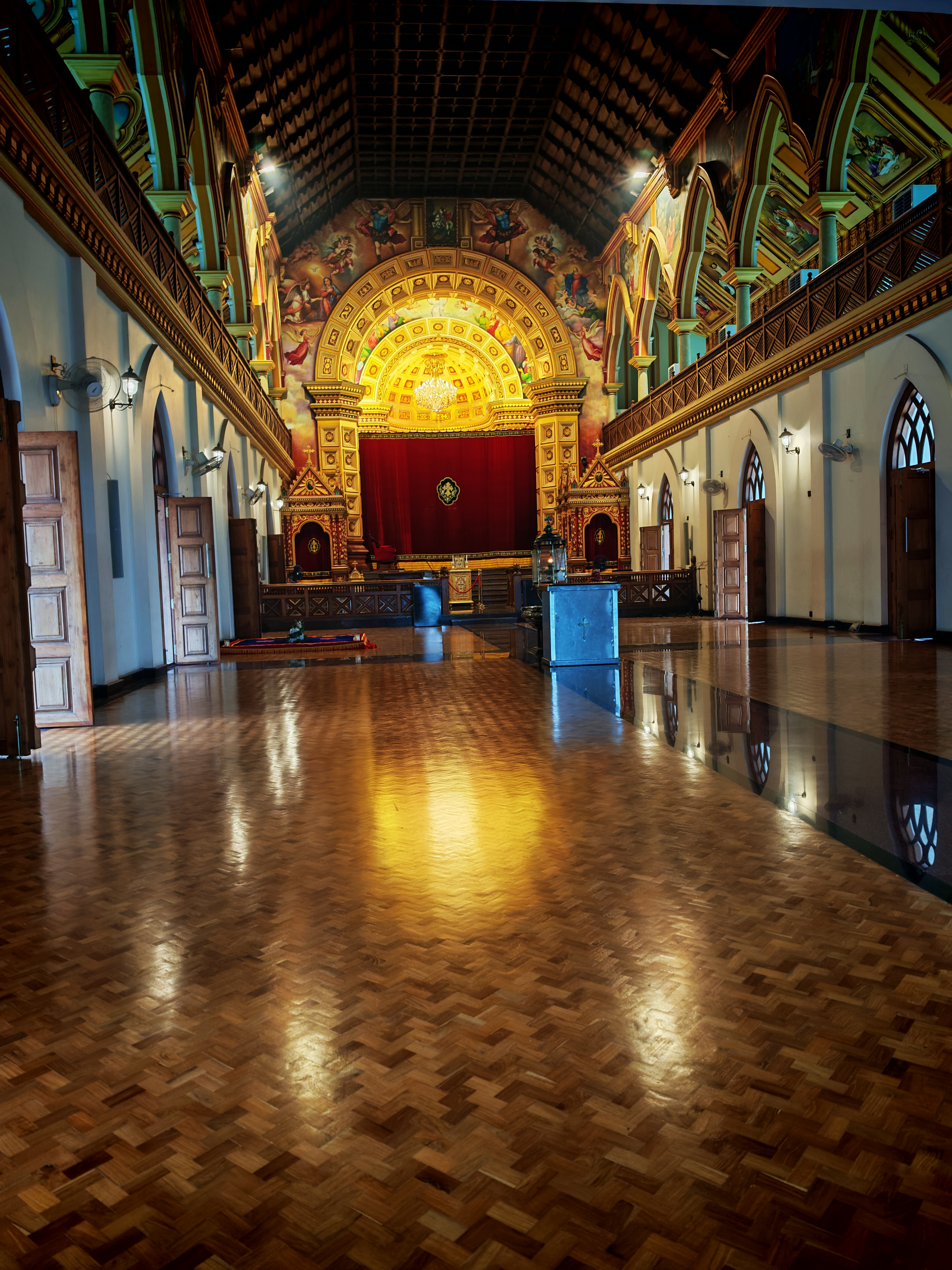

== Gallery ==
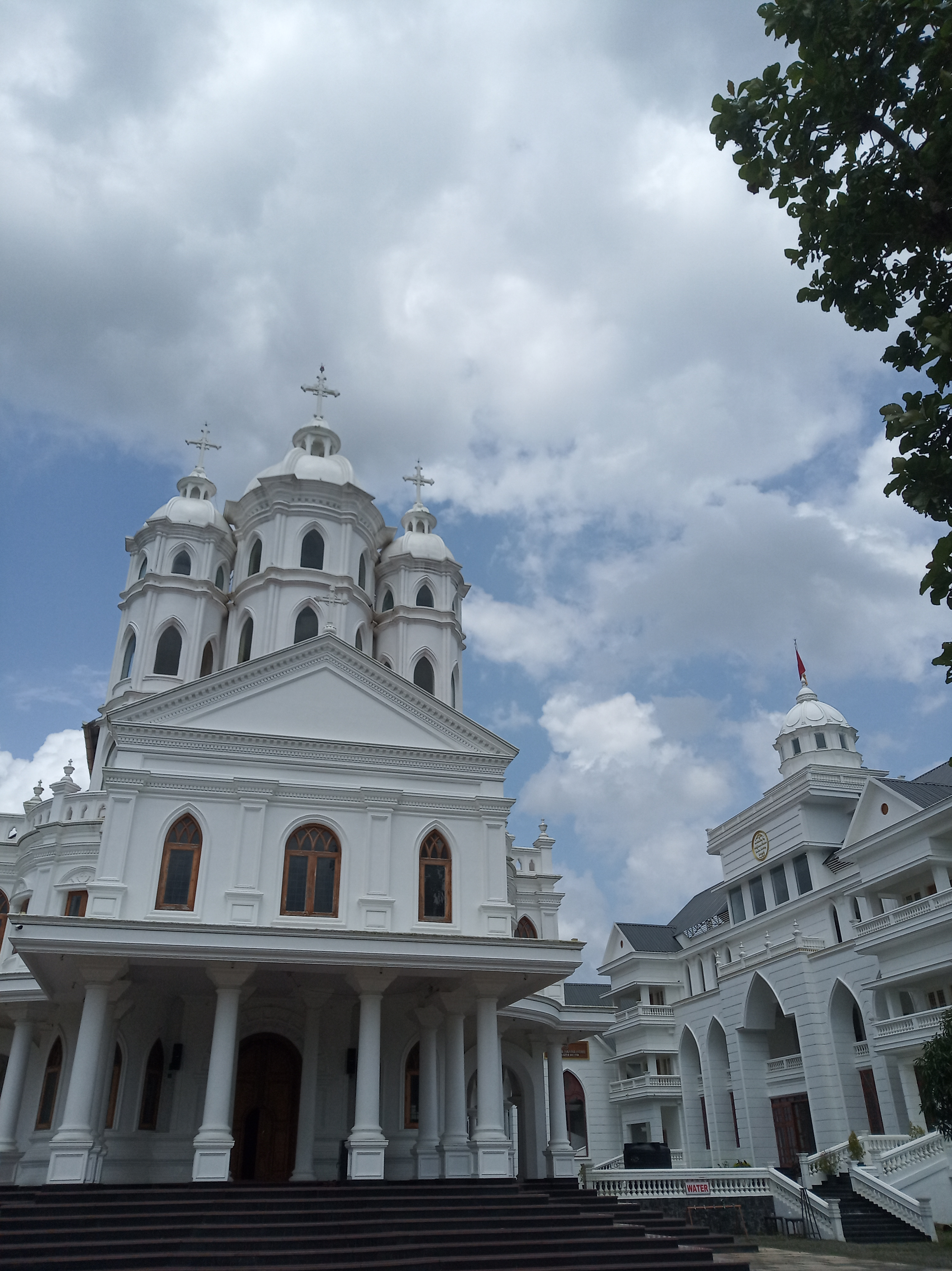
Front view of Malecruz Dayaro.

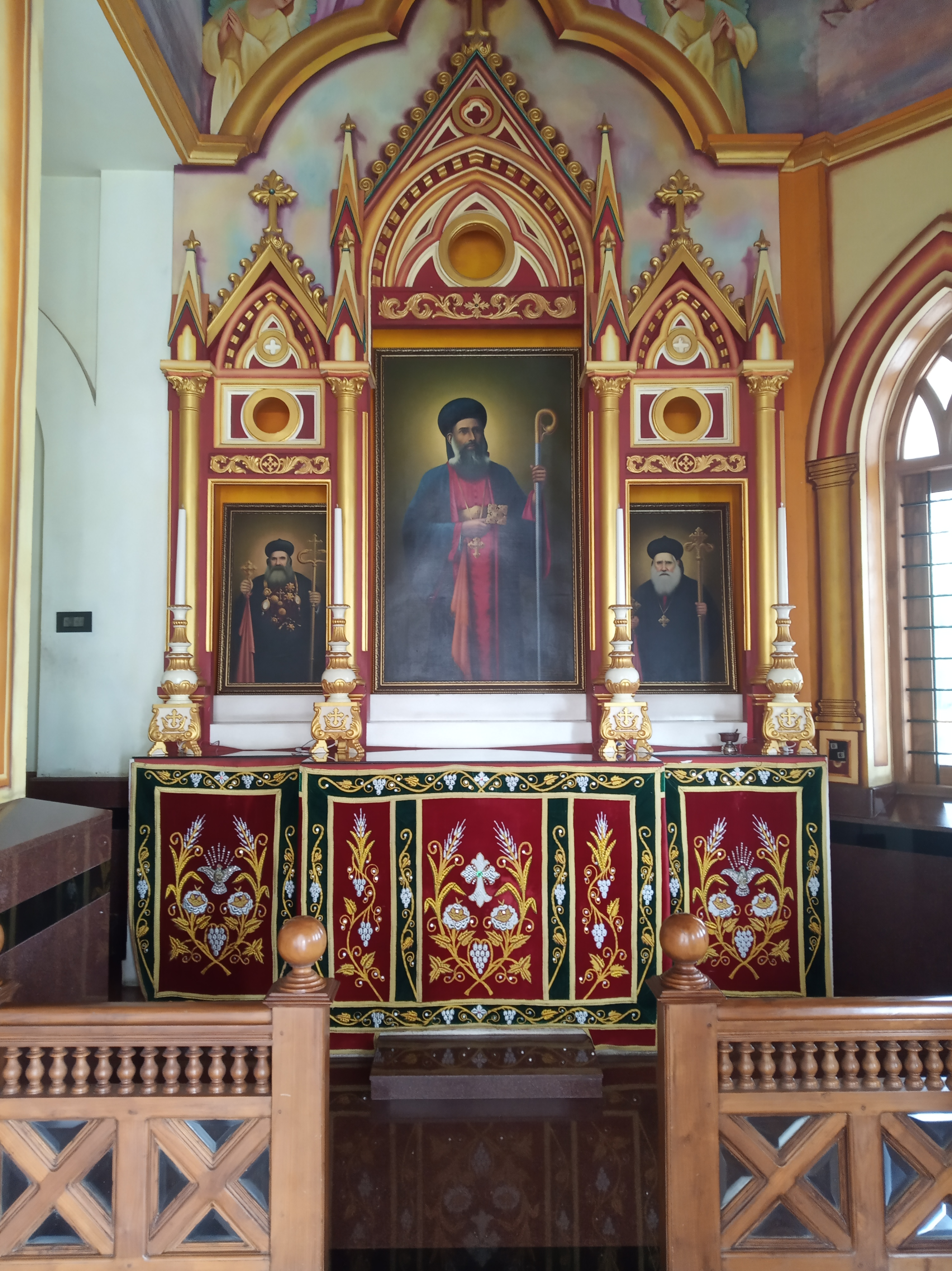
Holy Relics of Geevarghese Gregorios of Parumala, Ignatius Elias III and Osthatheos Sleeba

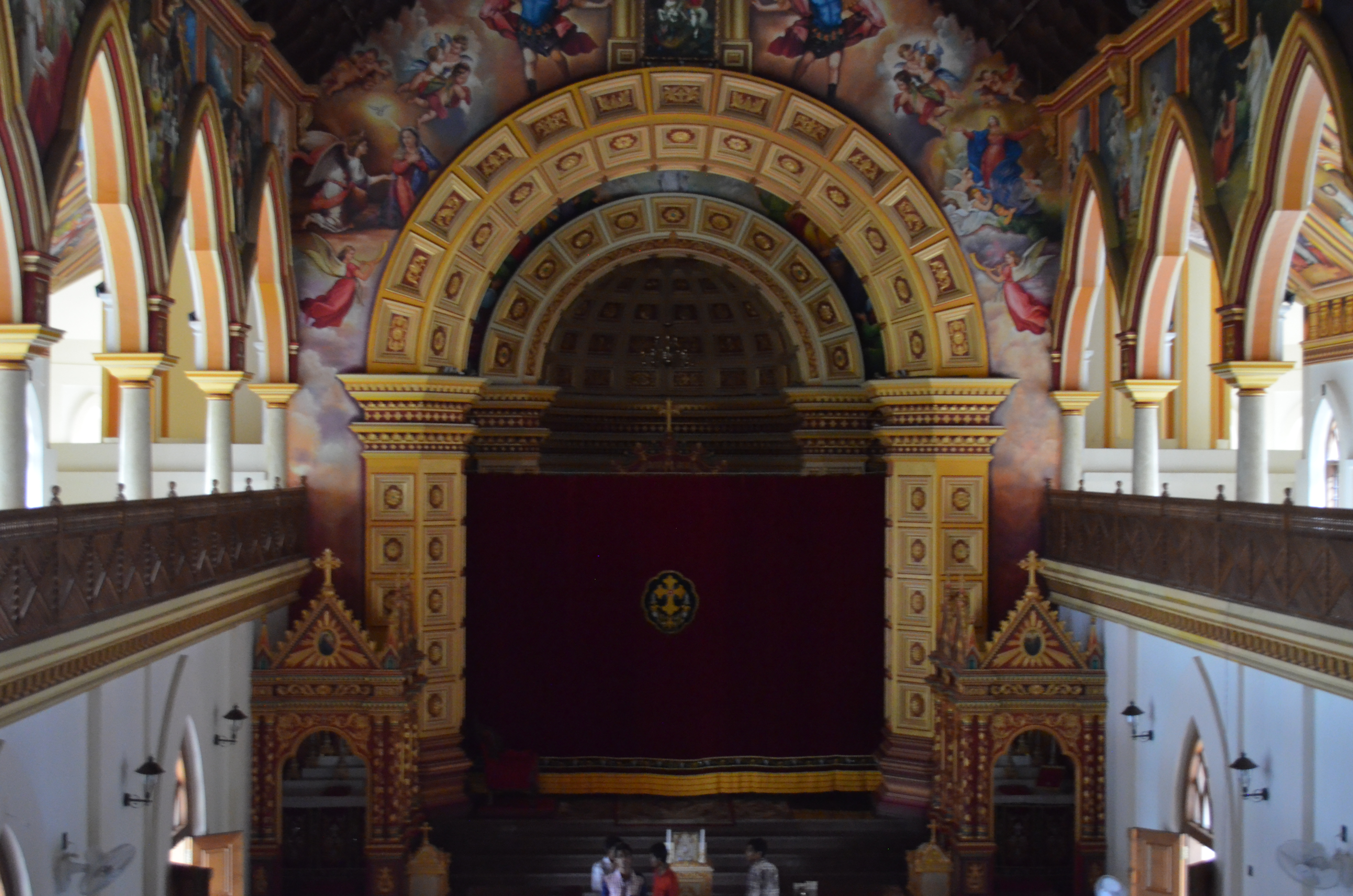
Holy Altar of Malecruz Dayaro.

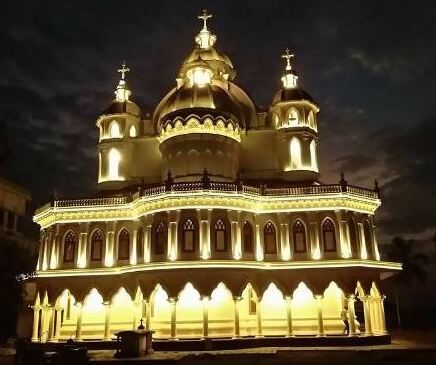
Night View of Malecruz Dayaro.

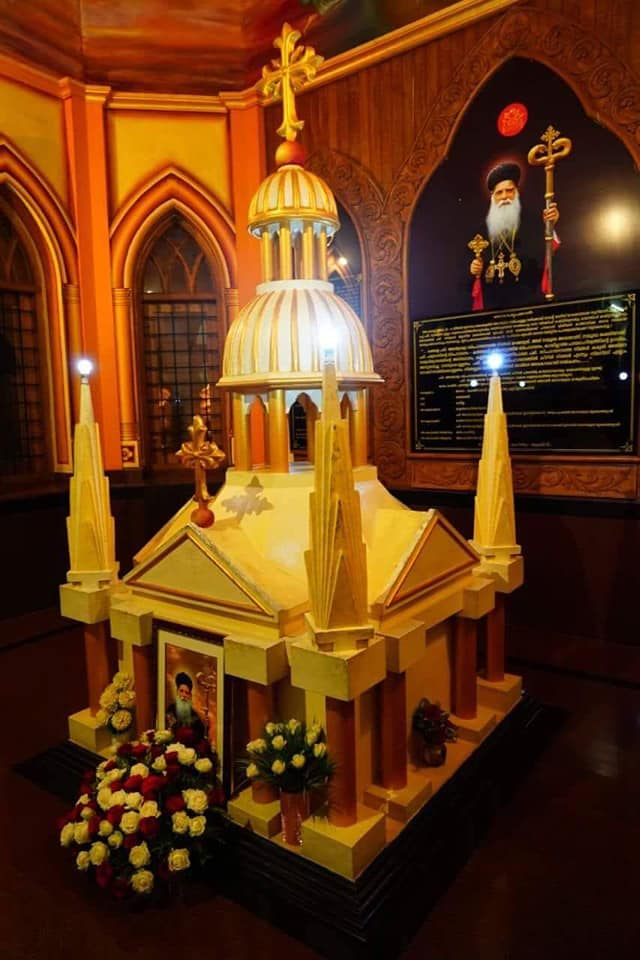
Tomb of Baselios Paulose II Catholicose of the East.
