= V. C. Samuel =

20th-century Indian theologian and priest

The Reverend V.C. Samuel
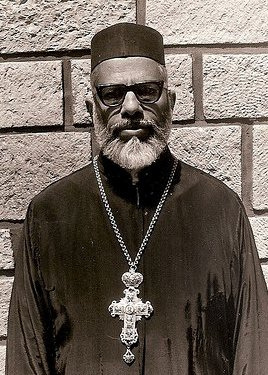

Personal details
- Born: 6 April 1912 Omalloor, Travancore (present day Pathanamthitta district, Kerala, India)
- Died: 18 November 1998 (aged 86) Bangalore, Karnataka
- Buried: Bangalore, Karnataka
- Denomination: Christian: Indian Orthodox
- Profession: Priest and Malpan; University Professor and Dean

V. C. Samuel

Academic background
- Education: Mor Ignatius Dayro Manjinikkara / Seminary, Union Christian College, Aluva (BA Philosophy); Madras Christian College (MA Philosophy); United Theological College, Bangalore (BD); Union Theological Seminary (New York City), (STM); Yale Divinity School, Yale University (PhD); University of Chicago(Post-Doc)
- Alma mater: Yale University

Academic work
- Institutions: St. Ignatius Monastery Manjinikkara / Seminary, Serampore College; Haile Selassie I University / Addis Ababa University, United Theological College, Bangalore; Orthodox Theological Seminary, Kottayam; Federated Faculty for Research in Religion and Culture (FFRRC), India; St. Ephrem Ecumenical Research Institute (SEERI)

Vilakuvelil Cherian Samuel (1912–1998), called Samuel Achen was an Indian Christian philosopher, scholar, university professor, theologian, historian, polyglot and ecumenical leader. He was a priest of the Malankara Orthodox Church. He was the author of many doctrinal books and papers including The Council of Chalcedon Re-Examined: Historical Theological Survey.

== Early life ==
Samuel was born 6 April 1912, at Edayil House – Cheekanal in the village of Omallur, in the British Raj Province of Travancore, now Pathanamthitta, Kerala, India. He was born in a Jacobite Syriac Orthodox family. He was the fifth child of nine children of his parents E. I. Cherian and Annamma. His father was a school teacher and educator who established 15 primary schools when there were few facilities for modern education and a member of the Legislative Assembly (Sree Moolam Popular Assembly).

== Education ==
Samuel was educated at a primary school founded by his father in his village and the Government English Middle School, Pathanamthitta, going on to the St. Thomas English High School (St. Thomas Higher Secondary School Kozhencherry). He received his English School Leaving Certificate (E.S.L.C) in 1931 with distinction.

=== Seminary teacher and scholar ===
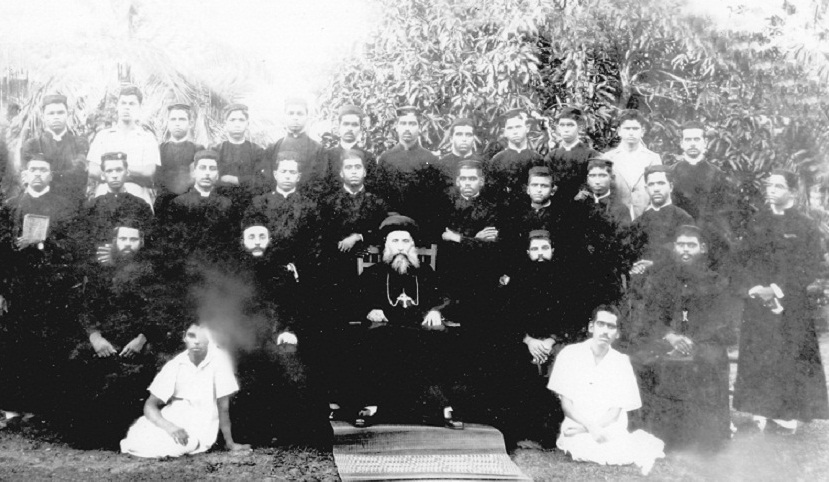
St. Ignatius Seminary Mor Ignatius Dayro Manjinikkara, Omalloor in the 1930s. Sitting middle row from left: 1. Fr. P.J. Paulose (later Baselios Paulose II, Catholicos) 2. Fr. Abdul Ahad Rabban (Founder Malapan – later Patriarch Ignatius Jacob III), 3. Mor Yulios Elias Qoro, the Delegate Metropolitan of the Patriarch of Antioch, 4. Fr. V.C. Samuel (Founder Malpan) and Fr. Geevarghese Vayalipparampil (Later Geevarghese Gregorios)

In addition to his general education, Samuel learned the Syriac language, which was the ecclesiastical and liturgical language of the St. Thomas Christians of Kerala.

Patriarch Mar Ignatius Elias III of Antioch visited India in 1932. Samuel had a keen interest in the patriarchal mission and was deeply moved when the Patriarch died at Manjanikkara, close to his home in 1932. The place where the Patriarch had died soon grew in stature as St. Ignatius Church, a center of religious activities, including the teaching of Syriac and Antiochene Syrian ecclesiastical doctrine.

Samuel pursued further Syriac studies at Manjanikkara Dayara (monastery). He had been attracted there by the presence of the Syrian Metropolitan Elias Mar Julius, the delegate of the Patriarch, and the Syrian Deacon and Rabban 'Abdel Ahad (monk), (who later become Patriarch Mor Ignatius Ya`qub III).

At the time, Samuel wanted to continue his theological research but had no plans to be ordained. He began to share teaching duties with a colleague, Malpan Dn. Abdul Ahad Remban and also served as the secretary and translator for the Metropolitan.

In addition to Malayalam, his mother tongue, Samuel learned Sanskrit, Tamil, Hindi and English. He continued studying languages, later learning Syriac. He maintained his knowledge of English by reading books on church history, theology, and biblical and devotional subjects.

In 1944, Samuel joined the Union Christian College as a priest and followed a programme of study and research for another sixteen years.

- 1944–1948 Union Christian College Alwaye, India: B.A. Degree in philosophy, first rank with gold medal, University of Travancore later University of Kerala)
- 1948–1950 Madras Christian College, India: M.A., Philosophy, First Class, Madras University
- 1950–1953 United Theological College, Bangalore, India: B.D., Theology, Distinction, with Special awards Serampore College, West Bengal, India
- 1953–1954 Union Seminary, New York: S.T.M, Post Graduates Degree in Theology magna cum laude
- 1954–1957 Yale Divinity School, New Haven, US: PhD, Yale University magna cum laude
- 1957–1960 University of Chicago, Chicago, US: Post Doctoral Research Scholar, Rockefeller Foundation Fellow

Samuel carried out research in several academic centres: Serampore College, West Bengal; United Theological College, Bangalore; CNI Library, Kottayam and Syriac Library of Pampakkuda all in India; Addis Ababa Library – Ethiopia; Bodleian Library, Oxford; British Museum Library / British Museum Reading Room, London; Library of the Bossey Ecumenical Institute, Switzerland; Library of the Jesuit College, Louvain; and the Vatican Library, Rome.

=== Doctoral research: Christological controversy ===
With a background in secular education, Samuel researched the History of Christian thought, which he chose for his specialization; the classical doctrine of the Person of Christ worked out in the fifth century, which led to the first division in the Church that continues today. Samuel's knowledge of philosophy, Syriac and Greek made it possible for him to work with ancient texts and documents to carry out his Alexandrine-Antiochene Christologies. In choosing this area of research, Samuel's purpose was ecumenism.

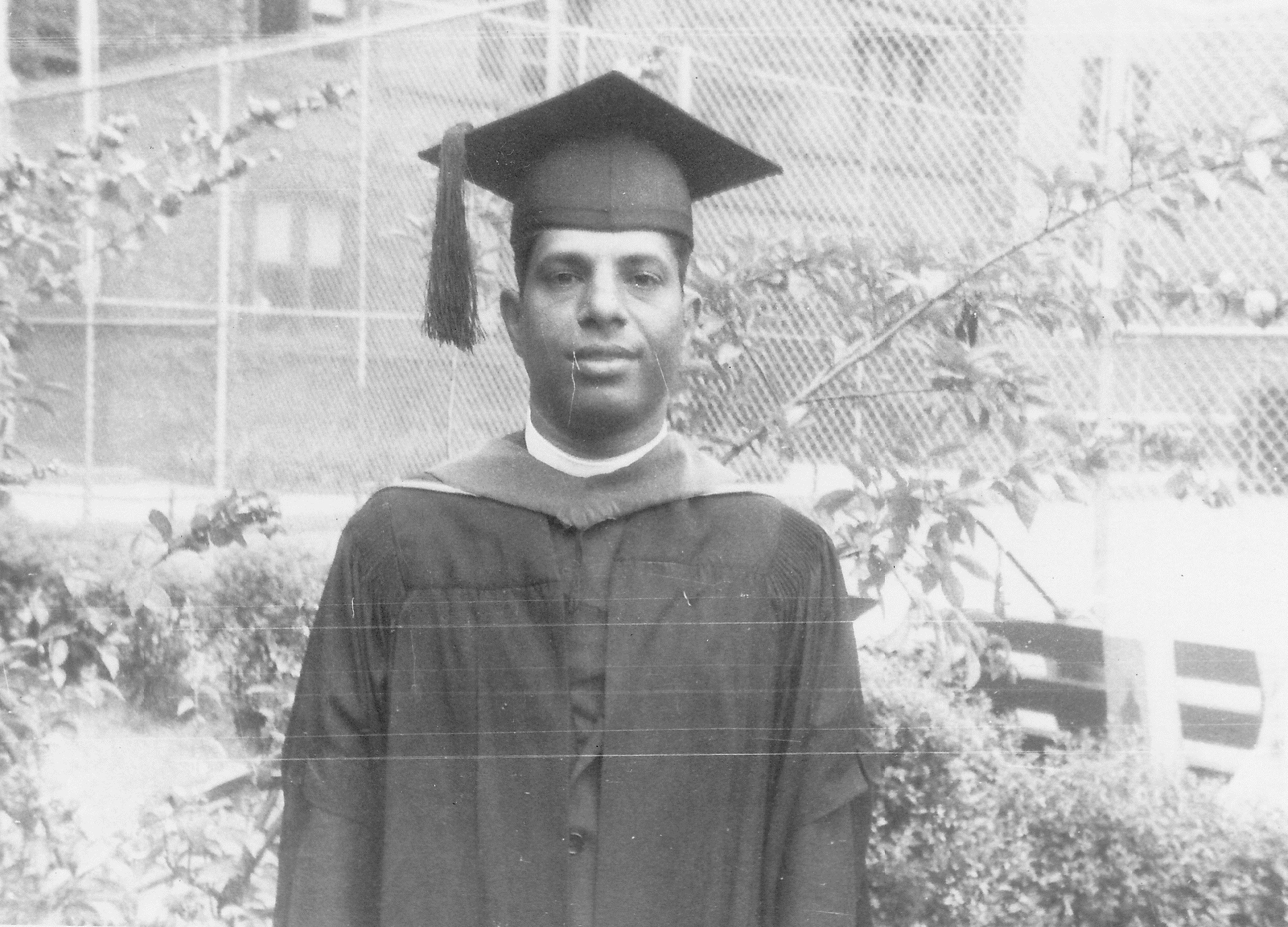
V.C. Samuel received PhD from Yale University 1957. The first Keralite and Second Indian to receive Doctorate from Yale.

The Council of Chalcedon in 451 was called to discuss the definition of the Godhead and manhood of Christ. Differences in opinion led to a major division in the Christian Church which has been interpreted by Church traditions, each in its own way to imply that the other sides were at fault. Samuel's purpose was, firstly, to find out why the division arose, and secondly, to clarify for all concerned why the Churches exist in a divided state. Finally, his work was intended to be of service to the Churches and improve the cause of Christian unity.

Samuel had a special concern for the Churches of the East, particularly those of the Oriental Orthodox family, which have continued in the history without formally acknowledging the Council of Chalcedon. These Church traditions have been referred to as "monophysite" heretical community by the Byzantine or the Eastern Orthodox Churches, the Catholic Church and the major Protestant Churches. Samuel researched the real point of the division following the council and the teaching of the Church Fathers who opposed it. He hoped to rescue Oriental Orthodoxy from centuries of intellectual oblivion. The doctoral thesis, "The Council of Chalcedon Re-examined: A Historical and Theological Survey" was published worldwide along with several papers. This stand represented the Oriental Orthodox perspective.

=== Post-doctoral research scholar ===
Samuel promoted the concept that the Church in India should be Indian. He had a deep interest in comparing the roots of the historic Christian faith with the religious heritage of Hinduism. He knew that the claim of Apostolic origin and the identity as Syrian Christians of India did not match its present standing either as part of the Catholic Church or of Antiochene Syrian Church. From this point of view both these sections of the Indian Christianity could envision a common future. Over the years, he promoted the history of the Indian Church and its foreign connections. He took the opportunity to compare them with other ancient Churches, particularly those of the East.

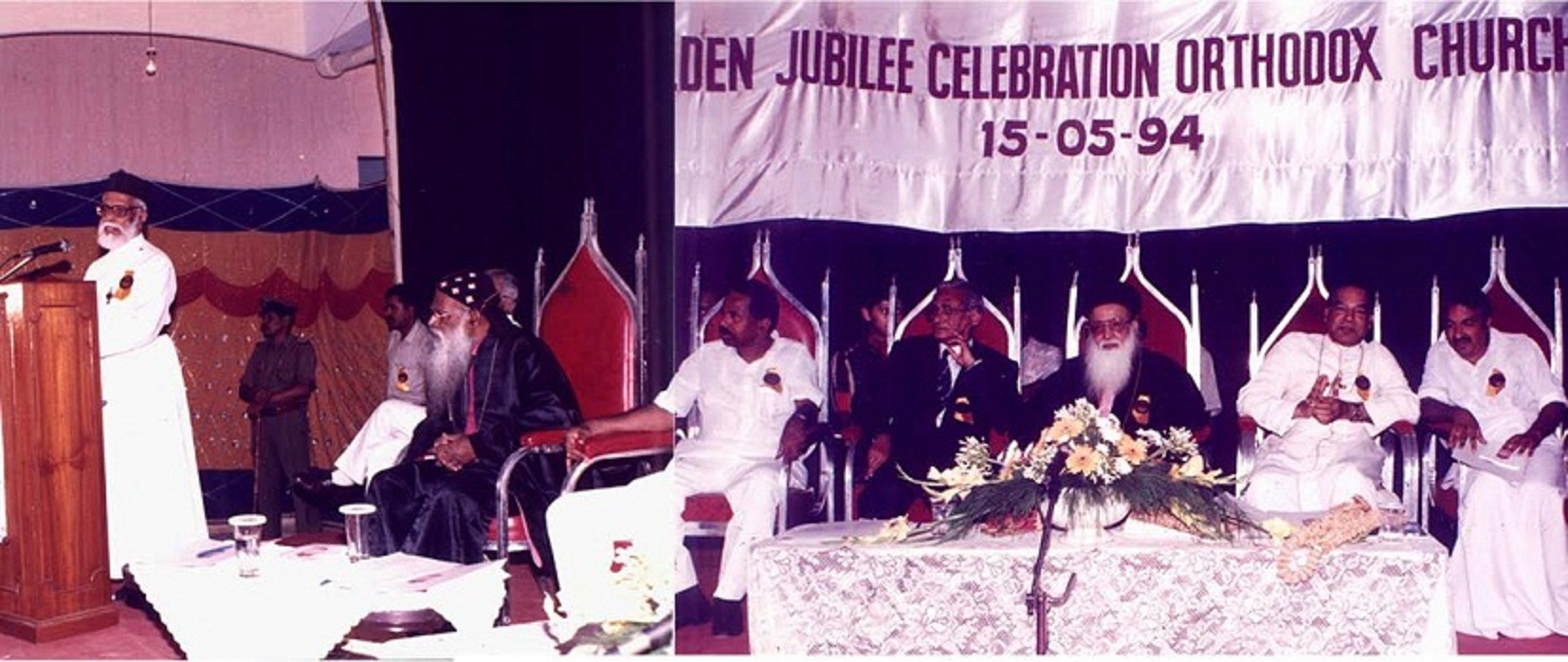
V.C. Samuel, the First Vicar and the Founder Father of many parishes for Orthodox Christianity in Bangalore addressing the Golden Jubily Celebrations 1994. Sitting in the dais from left Metropolitan Zachariah Mar Dianosius, Veerappa Moily, Chief Minister of Karnataka, Dr. P.C. Alexander, Governor of Maharashtra, Baselios Marthoma Mathews II, Catholicose, Alphonsus Mathias, Archbishop of Bangalore and Oommen Chandy, Finance Minister of Kerala.

On completing his doctorate at Yale, an opportunity arose for him to research Hinduism. At this time Dr. P.D. Devanandan was establishing the Christian Institute for the Study of Religion and Society in Bangalore. Samuel joined in 1957 under an appointment for the post-doctoral research programme sponsored by the University of Chicago. He was awarded the Rockefeller Fellowship for a period of three years which included research for two years in India and one year in Chicago. Besides Indian Philosophy, Sankaracharya's Advaita, Ramanujacharya's Visishtadvaita and Madvacharya's Dvaita Vedanta, he gained first-hand knowledge of the Philosophy of Swami Vivekananda and working of the Ramakrishna Mission as well as of several others in contemporary Indian movements like Mahatma Gandhi's gramaswaraj and Vinoba Bhave's Bhoodan movement.

== Polyglot ==
Samuel was familiar with fifteen languages including his mother tongue, Malayalam and a scholar in Sanskrit, Syriac, Hebrew, Greek, Ge'ez and Arabic which he could teach in seminaries and universities.

== Career ==
=== Teaching ===
- 1933–1944 Manjanikkara Dayara – Seminary (Malphano), Pathanamthitta, Kerala, India.
- 1960–1963 Serampore College, Serampore, West Bengal, India.
- 1963–1966 Theological College of the Holy Trinity, Haile Selassie I University (Addis Ababa University), Ethiopia.
- 1966–1968 United Theological College, Bangalore, Karnataka, India.
- 1968–1976 Theological College of the Holy Trinity, Haile Selassie I University, Addis Ababa
- 1977–1978 Ecumenical Christian Centre, Whitefield, Bangalore.
- 1978–1980 United Theological College, Bangalore.
- 1981–1991 Orthodox Theological Seminary, Kottayam (Orthodox Pazhaya Seminary), Kottayam, Kerala.
- 1982–1991 Federated Faculty for Research in Religion and Culture, Kerala.

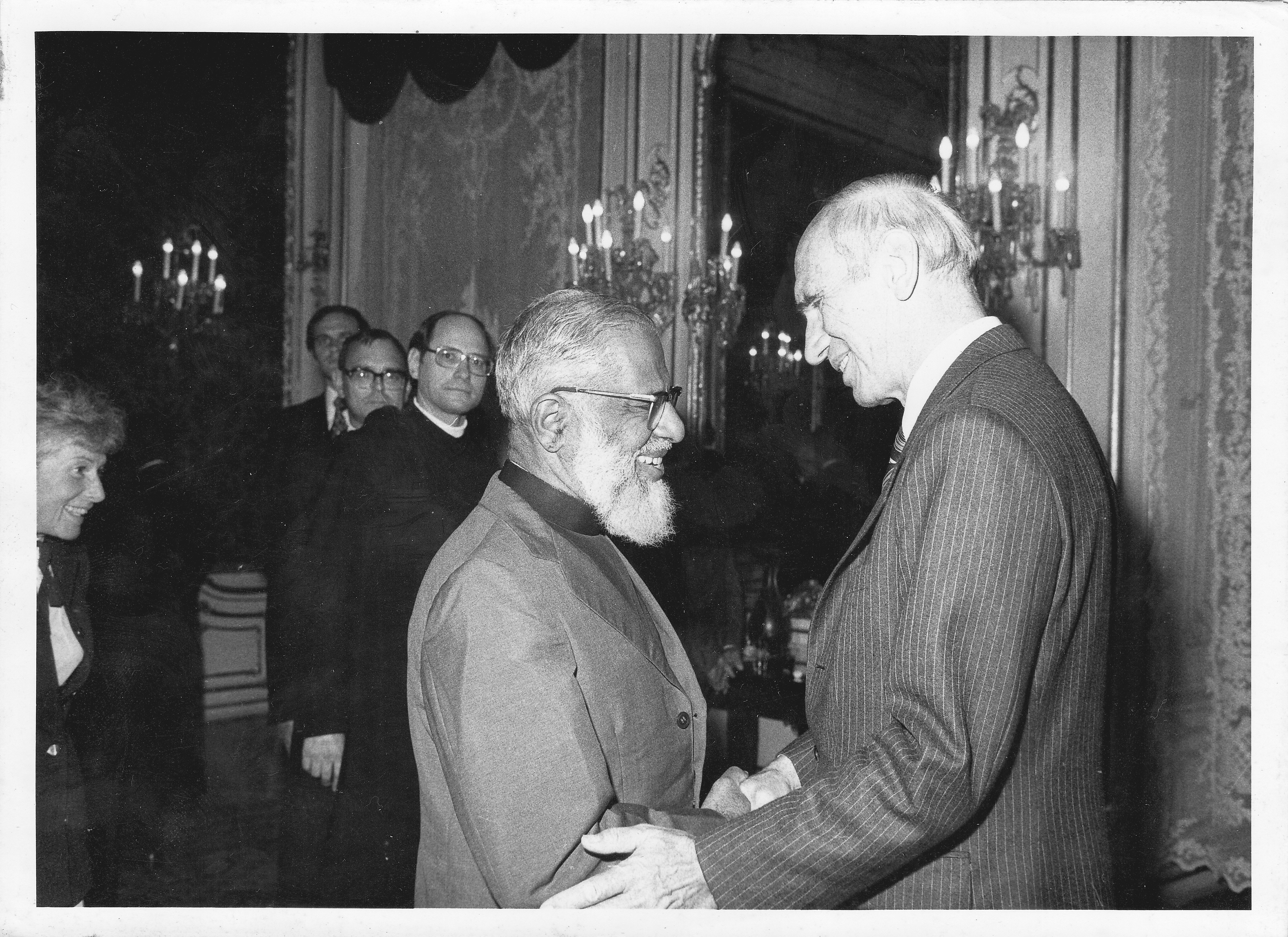
Dr Samuel meeting Rudolf Kirchschläger, the President of Austria in Vienna – 1978.

In addition to the above, Samuel served as a professor, guide, and examiner in almost all the seminaries and theological colleges in India, and many abroad.

=== Ecumenical movement ===
Samuel contributed to the ecumenical movement in the international arena for three decades. He was an accredited delegate of the Indian Orthodox Church at four of the General Assemblies of the World Council of Churches:

- 1954 – Evanston, United States.
- 1961 – New Delhi, India
- 1968 – Uppsala, Sweden, and
- 1976 – Nairobi, Kenya.

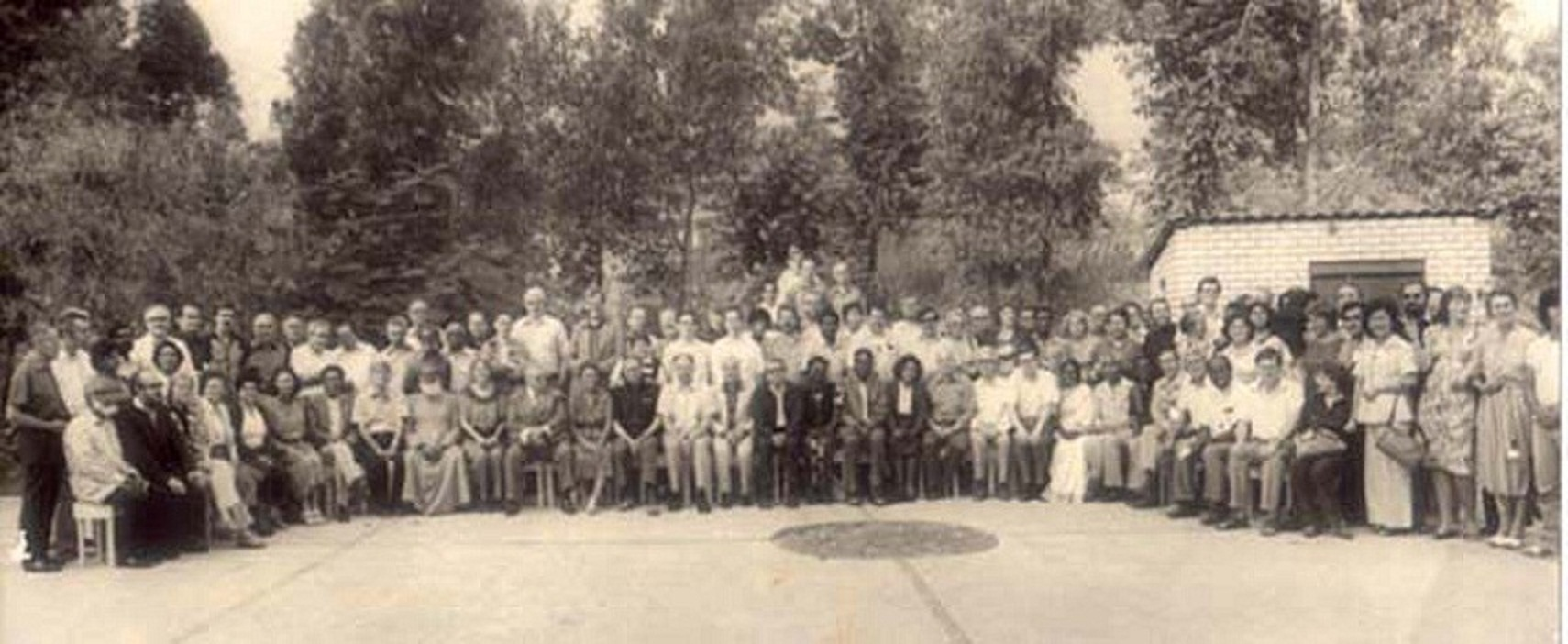
World Meeting of the Faith and Order Commission of World Council of Churches at Lima, Peru −1982. V.C. Samuel sitting extreme left who was privileged to release Baptism Eucharist Ministry (BEM) Text, one of the historic doctrinal document.

=== Faith and Order Commission ===
The New Delhi World Assembly of World Council of Churches in 1961 voted Samuel as a member of the council's Faith and Order Commission. He held that position until 1984. The fourth general assembly of the WCC, at Uppsala in 1968, elected him as a member of the commission's Working Committee and later in its steering committee. His active participation in the meetings of Faith and Order Commission was influential and expressed the importance of church unity. In his paper in the Faith and Order meeting at Accra 1974 on the subject "How can the Unity of the Church be Achieved" he points to the influence of "different intellectual and cultural backgrounds" in the evolution the different church traditions, awareness of which should help relativize these traditions. He was a participant of seven meetings of the commission.

- 1963 – Montreal, Canada
- 1964 – Arhus, Denmark
- 1967 – Bristol, UK
- 1971 – Louvain, Belgium
- 1974 – Accra, Ghana
- 1978 – Bangalore, India and
- 1982 – Lima, Peru

=== Joint commissions ===
Samuel took a part in a number of study projects and joint commissions of the Catholic, Eastern Orthodox, Oriental Orthodox, and Protestant Churches. The papers presented took an interest in discussing the issues from an Oriental Orthodox perspective. The papers were published under the auspices of the World Council of Churches:

- Apostolicity and Catholicity
- The Early Councils
- The Council of Chalcedon
- Authority of the Bible
- Uniatism and its Problem
- Baptism, Eucharist and Ministry Text; or Lima Document

=== Dialogue between Eastern and Oriental Orthodox theologians ===
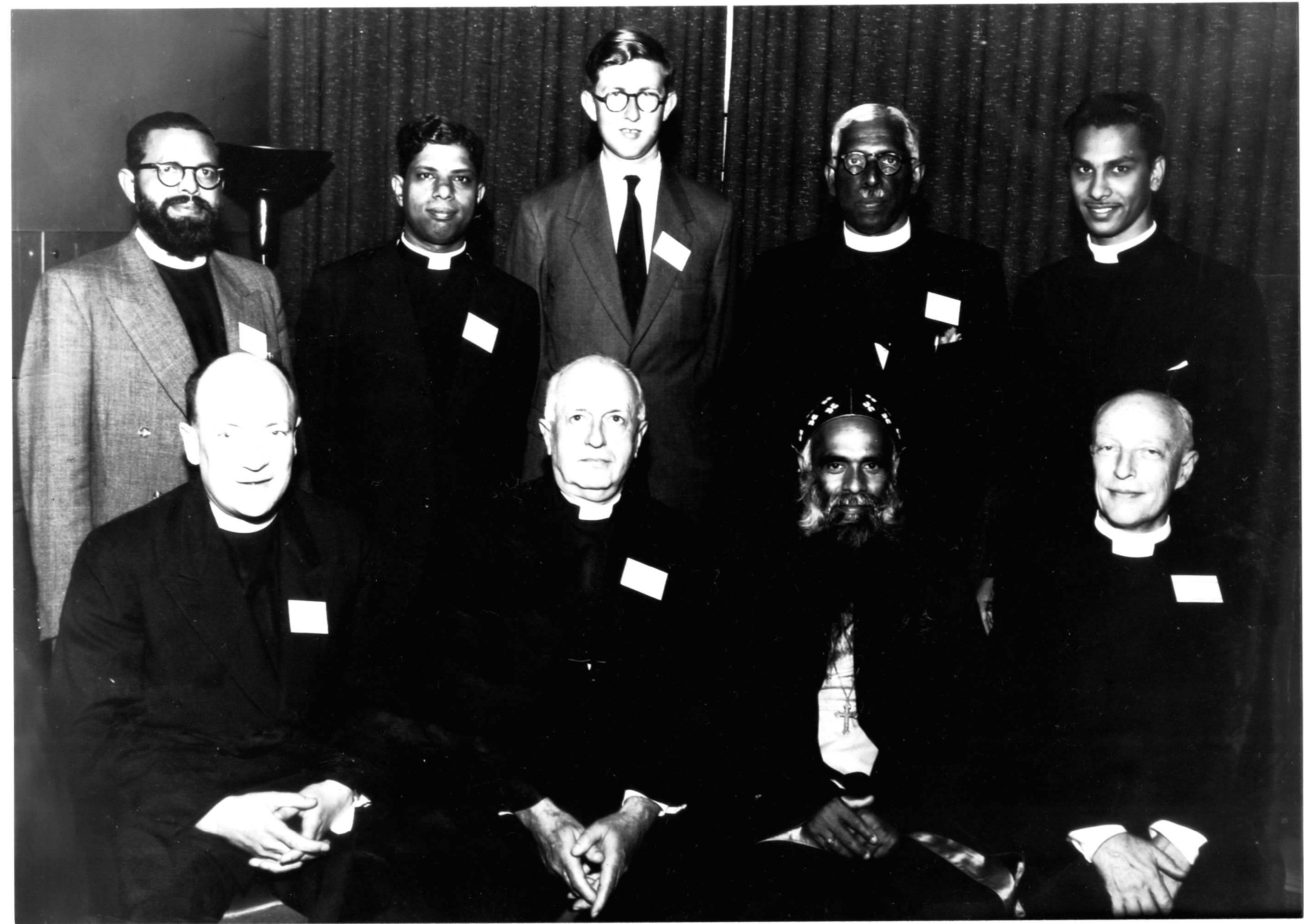
World Council of Churches Evanston Assembly 1954. Official Delegates of Indian Orthodox Church: Daniel Mar Philaxinos, Fr. K. Philipos (Philipose Mar Theophilos), Fr. Dr. V..C. Samuel, Fr. Dr. C.T. Eapen, Dn. P.S. Samuel (Cor-Episcopa) with Rev. Herbert Waddams, U.K, Geoffrey Fisher, Archbishop of Canterbury, and Henry Knox Sherrill. Presiding Bishop of the Episcopal Church of America.

Samuel attended the "Unofficial Consultation of Theologians of the Eastern and Oriental Orthodox Churches" held in Arhus-1964, Bristol-1967, Geneva-1970 and Addis Ababa-1971 and presented papers at all of them. He was involved in the participants' arriving at the conclusion that the difference in Christological Doctrine between the two families of Churches was only verbal and not substantial. These papers and joint agreed statements have been published in different journals.

=== Dialogue between Catholic and Oriental Orthodox theologians ===
Samuel was involved in four consultations organised by the Pro Oriente Foundation of Vienna, Austria in 1972. These were called "Unofficial Consultations of Theologians of the Catholic and Oriental Orthodox Churches". He participated in them as an Orthodox theologian, presenting papers that were published under the auspices of the Pro Oriente Foundation. The first three of the consultations discussed the doctrine of the Person of Jesus Christ, on which there was agreement among participants that the difference between two Church traditions was not substantial.

Starting in 1964, Samuel took part in almost all the various meetings of the Unofficial Consultation of Theologians of Oriental Orthodox, Eastern Orthodox and Roman Catholic Churches presenting papers, participating in discussions, and drafting out the agreed statements. He served as a member of a group called together by the Faith and Order Commission of the World Council of Churches for a study, first of the Councils of early Church, and later of the Council of Chalcedon. The papers presented were published in the Greek Orthodox Theological Review, Brookline, Massachusetts, United States, Wort und Worhiet, Pro Oriente, Vienna, Ecumenical Review, World Council of Churches, Geneva and Abba Salama, Addis Ababa. Samuel's research helped to pave the way for a closer understanding and better relationship between the Chalcedonian and Non Chalcedonian Christendom, after a period of fifteen centuries of split and schism.

=== Ethiopian life ===
The Church of Ethiopia and Haile Selassie I University (since renamed Addis Ababa University) persuaded Samuel to travel to Ethiopia. The college appointed him Dean of the Theological College of the Holy Trinity in 1969, a position that he held until he left Ethiopia in July 1976. He also served as the Secretary of the Faculty Council of the university.

=== The Great Conference of Oriental Orthodox Churches ===
Samuel helped organize the Conference of the Oriental Orthodox Churches with the initiative of both the Emperor Haile Selassie I and the acting Patriarch of Ethiopia, Abune Theophilus (later Patriarch). The conference brought together the five Oriental Orthodox Churches, Coptic, Syriac, Armenian, Ethiopian and Indian, which were isolated after the fifth century. He was a member of the local committee and General Coordinator, responsible for the preparatory work of the Addis Ababa Conference of the Heads of Oriental Orthodox Churches, held in January 1965. He was also one of the delegates along with Fr. T. C. Jacob and others in the Conference with the Catholicos Baselios Augen I and others representing the Indian Orthodox Church. He also edited and published the report of the Conference.

=== Association of Ethio-Hellenic Studies ===
Samuel entered into a programme initiated by Methodios Fouyas, the Metropolitan of the Greek Orthodox Church of Aksum, founding the Association of Ethio-Hellenic Studies. He was the vice-president and was on the editorial board of the publications 'Abba Salama' and the 'Ecliastca Fharan', in English, Greek, Amharic and Ge'ez languages.

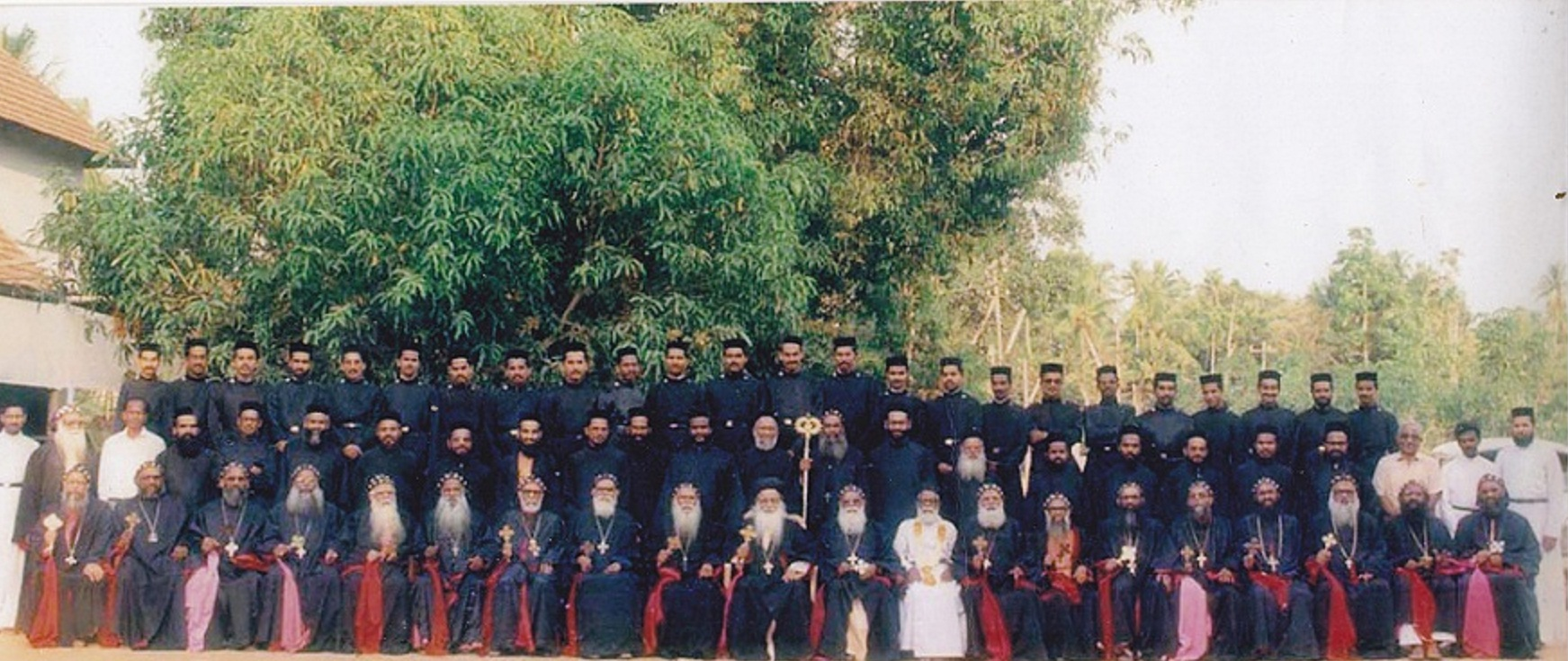
Baselios Marthoma Mathews II The Catholicos of the East (Indian Orthodox Church) with the Episcopal Synod Members of the Malankara Orthodox Church and the Staff and Students of the Orthodox Theological Seminary, Kottayam, jointly honoured (Guru Vandanam) the Great Malpan and Grand Guru of Gurus in 1990. V.C. Samuel sitting in the middle with white cassock and harem.

=== Wider Ecumenism in the Indian context ===
Samuel played a major role in persuading the Indian Orthodox Church to abandon its old policy of isolation from other church traditions in India, and to join the Kerala Christian Council, the National Council of Churches, and the joint commission of Catholic and Oriental Orthodox Churches. Throughout his life, he expressed his desire to see the unity of the Indian churches that belong to the Syrian tradition. Unity with the 'Jacobite Faction' of the Indian Orthodox Church was given priority. An ecumenical unity with the churches belonging to the Protestant tradition was also envisaged. As an Indian Christian V.C Samuel advocated the need of fostering wider ecumenism with other faiths in general and Hinduism in particular.

=== Ministry in the Indian (Malankara) Orthodox Church ===
Ordained at the age of twenty-five Samuel continued his ministry in the Indian Orthodox Church for a period of six decades:

- 1931–1932 Inspector, Sunday School
- 1932–1940 Secretary and Translator of Elias Mar Julius, Delegate Bishop of the Patriarch
- 194-1940 Malpan St. Ignatius Dayara, (Seminary), Manjinikkara, Omalloor
- 1935 Ordained as a Deacon.
- 1937 Ordained as a Priest
- 1937–1940 Priest and Malpan, Manjinikkara Dayara and Seminary
- 1940–1944 Vicar and Malpan, St. Thomas Syrian Orthodox Church Chengalam, Kottayam, Kerala
- 1944–1948 Alwaye, Kerala, India
- 1944–1998 Member, Governing Board of the Christu Shishya Ashram, Thadakom, Coimbatore, Tamil Nadu, India
- 1948–1950 Service in Thambaram and Madras City
- 1950–1953 First full-time Vicar, of the Orthodox Christian Church in Bangalore, Holy Trinity Church, Bangalore.
- 1950–1953 Started a new congregation in Jalahalli area and conducted Holy Qurbana intermittent
- 1957–1959 During Post Doctoral Research program, Spiritual service in Holy Trinity Church, Bangalore and Jalahally intermittent. Later in 1966 Jalahalli Congregation developed in to full-fledged parish dedicated in the name of St. Mary. in 1966. Founder Father of St. Mary's Orthodox Valiyapally, Jalahally East, Bangalore
- 1960–1963 Spiritual Service in Serampore College Chapel, Barrakpore, across the River Hoogly, Calcutta
- Foundation Stone laid for the Calcutta Parish
- 1963–1966 Indian Orthodox Congregation, in Addis Ababa, Ethiopia
- 1966–1968 During the teaching in United Theological College Intermittent Service in Holy Trinity Church, Bangalore and St. Mary's Orthodox Valiyapally, Jalahalli
- 1966 Appointed as the founder president of the new Church building Committee for Bangalore Orthodox Congregation
- 1972 New Church was dedicated in the name of St. Gregorios of Parumala (St. Gregorios Orthodox Cathedral, Bangalore) 1972
- 1968 Appointed as the Ambassador of the Indian Orthodox Church in Ethiopia and African Countries, by Baselios Augen I, Catholicose of the East
- 1968–1976 Vicar, Addis Ababa
- 1970 Inauguration of the parsonage of the St. Gregorios Orthodox Cathedral, Bangalore
- 1976–1982 Formation of new Congregation in Bangalore East. Conducted Holy Qurbana in Sevanilayam Chapel for six years
- 1982 Bangalore East congregation built a new church building and dedicated in the name of St. Thomas. Founder Father of the St. Thomas Orthodox Church, Bangalore East
- 1982–1998 Formation of St. Stephen's Orthodox Chapel, Rajajinagar, Bangalore. later St. Stephens Orthodox Church, Vijayanagar, Bangalore. Founder Father

=== Association ===
- Founder Chief Advisor, Church Weekly, Alwaye, India
- Chief Advisor and Lifelong Governing Board member; Christu Sishya Ashram, Tadagom, Coimbatore, India
- Hindu Christian Dialogue, CISRS, Bangalore
- Editor, Indian Journal of Theology, Calcutta
- Secretary and Editor, Theological Forum, Bangalore
- Founder Vice-president and Editor, Association of Ethio-Hellenic Studies, Addis Ababa, Ethiopia
- Editor Abba Salama, Review of Ethio Hellenic Studies, Journal, Addis Ababa
- Editor Ecclisiastica Faran. Addis Ababa
- Patron, Indian Community School, Addis Ababa
- President, St. Gregorios Orthodox Cathedral, Bangalore (Church Building Committee 1967
- WCC Delegate, Christian Muslim Dialogue
- Advisor, All Africa Christian Conference
- Advisor, Emperor Haile Selassie I
- Advisor, Abuna Theophilos, Patriarch of the Ethiopian Orthodox Church
- Member and Chief Advisor, Church History Association of India, Bangalore
- Editorial board member, History of Christianity in India, Bangalore
- Editorial Executive Member, Bible Commentary, CSS, Thiruvalla
- Editorial Executive Encyclopedia of Indian Orthodox Church
- Editorial Board Ethiopian Orthodox Church Publications
- Governing board member, Orthodox Theological Seminary, Kottayam
- Resource Person, Thiruvachanabhashyam, Kottayam
- Resource Person Divyabodhanam, Kottayam
- Editorial board member, Malankara Sabha, Kottayam
- Editorial board member, Purohithan
- Member Joint International Commission: Catholic Church and Malankara Orthodox Church
- Chief Editor, Harp, Kottayam
- Chief Advisor, St. Ephrem Ecumenical Research Institute, Kottayam
- President, Fifty Golden Years Celebrations Committee, Bangalore

=== Ambassador of the Indian Church ===
The church planned to consecrate him as a bishop in the early 1950s. He declined the offer and instead chose to continue to pursue ecumenism through academia.

In 1968, the Catholicose Baselius Ougen I, the Head of the Malankara Orthodox Church appointed Samuel as the Christian Embassador to Ethiopia and other African Countries.

== Doctor of the Church ==
In 1991, Professor Samuel Chandanappally published Malankara Sabha Pithakkanmar Fathers of the Malankara Church. The book listed Samuel as the greatest Doctor of the Indian Church.

== Marriage and family life ==
After serving as a priest for approximately sixteen years, Dr. V. C. Samuel made the decision to marry at the age of forty-one. Prior to this step, he obtained formal permission from both his Bishop and His Holiness the Catholicos. Dr. V. C. Samuel addressed the topic of priestly marriage in various publications, including Church Weekly. He emphasised that there was no theological basis to insist that marriage must occur exclusively before one's ordination as a priest.

His argument revolved around two key points: Firstly, he underscored that already a majority of priests within the Orthodox Churches were fulfilling their roles while being married. Therefore, he believed that choosing to marry after ordination would not impact one's status as a priest.

Secondly, Dr. V. C. Samuel pointed out that historical records indicated the Church of Malabar had previously permitted priests to marry, and even remarry in cases of widowhood, subsequent to their ordination. Furthermore, there were instances where notable figures such as Patriarch Peter III and various Bishops, both Syrian and Indian, had approved individual cases of priests entering matrimony and even remarrying.

It was the Roman Catholics who arrived in Kerala during the 16th century that opposed the idea of married priests.

The task of regularising and formalising this historical practice fell to Dr. V. C. Samuel.

In 1953, at the age of forty-one, he married Kunjannamma Pilo in the chapel of Chisthu Sishya Ashram in Thadagam. They shared an exemplary married life, and in 1954, they welcomed their only son, Zacharia. Unfortunately, Kunjannamma's life was tragically cut short in 1968 due to a car accident.

== Death ==
Samuel died in the early morning of Wednesday 18, November 1998 at his residence in Bangalore. The funeral service was conducted two days later at St. Gregorios Cathedral where he had served. Bishops Philipose Mar Eusebius and Mathews Mar Severus, his former students, led the service assisted by hundreds of Priests. Baselios Mar Thoma Mathews II, who was unable to attend due to hospitalization, flew directly to Bangalore after his discharge from the hospital on 22nd morning and conducted Thanksgiving Holy Qurbana at the cathedral, and delivered a memorial.

== Bibliography ==
Samuel published in India and abroad. A list of most titles, with publisher and date of publication, is given below. His writings are listed under three headings.

1. Articles, papers, book reviews etc., in popular newspapers like Malayala Manorama, Deepika, Weeklies, Church Papers and Religious journals. Some of them deal with the issues in a learned way and some in a more popular manner.
2. Lengthy papers dealing with theology, Christology, Church history, ecclesiology, canon, ecumenism, Hinduism, Philosophy of Vivekananda, and Ramakrishna Mission and other contemporary subjects, were published, by WCC, Geneva, Greek Orthodox Theological Review, Athens, Wort and Worhiet, Vienna, Abba Salama, Addis Ababa, Indian Journal of Theology, Religion and Society, Star of the East, etc.
3. Books: From 1959 to 1995, Samuel published twenty-five books. He has also written the History of Christianity, in Kerala section in volume IV of the History of Christianity in India for the Church History Association of India. His autobiographical piece 'Ente Chinthavikasanam' (Evolution of My Thinking) 1957 and the 'Swanubhavavediyil, (My Life Experience) which was published at the age of 85.

=== Books in English ===
- Marriage and Celibacy; Addis Ababa, 1972
- Ramakrishna Movement: The World Mission of Hinduism; Christian Institute for the Study of Religion and Society (CISRS), Bangalore, India, 1959
- The Oriental Orthodox Churches Addis Ababa Conference January 1965; Ed. For the Interim Committee, m Addis Ababa, Ethiopia, 1965.,
- Christianity and Indigenization; Addis Ababa, 1976
- The Council of Chalcedon Re-Examined: A Historical Theological Survey; Indian Theological library, No.8, Christian Literature Society (C.L.S), Madras, India, 1977. British Orthodox Press, London, UK, 2003.
- An Orthodox Catechism on The Faith and Life of the Church; Mar Gregorios Orthodox Christian Student
- Movement (MGOCSM), Kottayam, India, 1983.
- Truth Triumphs: Life and Achievements of Metropolitan Mar Dionysius VI; Malanakara Orthodox Church (M.O.C), Kottayam, India, 1986
- The Growing Church: An Introduction to Indian Church History; Divya Bodhanam Publication, Orthodox Theological Seminary (O.T.S), Kottayam, India, 1992.
- Fifty Golden Years; Orthodox Congregations, Bangalore, India, 1994.
- Orthodox Catechism: Text Book – Class VIII, Oriental Orthodox Churches.
- Orthodox Catechism: Text Book – Class IX, Oriental Orthodox Churches.
- Orthodox Catechism: Text Book – Class X, Oriental Orthodox Churches.
- Orthodox Catechism: Text Book – Class XI, Oriental Orthodox Churches.
- Orthodox Catechism: Text Book – Class XII, Oriental Orthodox Churches.
- An Introduction to Christian Theology

==== Co-author ====
- Syrian Orthodox Eucharistic Worship: Ways and Worship; Ed.H.R.Machphail, Madras, 1950.
- An Ancient Church: A Glance into the Past and Peep into the Future; New Life in an Old Church, Ed. M.V.George, Calcutta, 1963.
- Faith of Christianity; Christianity, published by Punjab University, 1969.
- The Faith of the Church; The Church of Ethiopia:A Panorama of History and Spiritual Life, Addis Ababa, Ethiopia 1972
- God Whom We Worship: The Teachings of Gregory Nazianzen; Prayer and Contemplation, Asirvanam Benedictine Monastery, Bangalore, 1980
- Grace in the Cappadocian Fathers; Divine Grace and Human Response, Asirvanam Monastery, 1981.
- The Indian Church and Autonomy; Orthodox Identity in India, Ed, M.K.Kuriakose, Fr.V.C. Samuel 75th Birth Day Celebration Committee, Bangalore −1988
- Christological Controversy; Orthodox Identity in India
- History of the Malanakara Orthodox Christians, 18th Century; Indian Church History, Vol.

=== Books in Malayalam ===
- Yesu Christu Aaru (Who is Jesus Christ?); Christian Literature Society (CLS), Thiruvalla, India. 1967.
- Ithe Oru Indian Sabhayo? Is this an Indian Church?; Distribution, C.L.S, Thiruvalla, India, 1974.
- Sabha Valarunnu, (The Growing Church);: Indian Church History, Vol. I, Divyabodahan Series, O.T.S, Kottayam, India, 1984.
- Adhunika Bharatha Sabha (Modern Indian Church): Indian Church History, Vol.II; Divyabodahanam Series,
- O.T.S, Kottayam, India, 1984.
- Apposthala Pravarthikal Oru Vyakayanam, (Acts of Apostles and Commentary); Translation from Greek and
- The Commentary; Thiruvachanabhashyam, O.T. S, Kottayam, India.
- Mar Divannasios Nalaman, Cheppad Mar Divannasios: Mar Dionysius Charitable Trust, Kerala, India.
- Swanubhavavediyil: Malayalam, Autobiography, MGOCSM, Kottayam, India.
- Malankara Anthiokian Bandhathile Chila Charitra Satyangal (Certain Truth about the Connection between
- The Churches of Malanaka and Antioch): Malankarasabhadeepam, Kottayam, India.
- Kristhuvijnaniyam; (A series of articles designed for publication as a book), Purohithan, Kottayam

==== Co-author ====
- Sabhayude Adisthana Viswasangal (Basic Faith of the Church); Irupatam Nuttandile Malankara Sabha (The Church of Malabar in the Twentieth Century) Ed. T.G.Zacharia and K.V.Mammen, Kottayam, 1977.
- Malankara Sabhayude Antiokian Bandham (The Connection of Church of Malabar with Antioch); Irupatham Nuttandile Malankara Sabha, Ed.T.G.Zacharia and K.V.Mammen, Kottayam, 1977. It was published in Malankara Sabha, Kottayam.
- Yesu Christu – Aposttolica Prakyapanam (Jesus Christ – Apostolic Proclamation: Vedaputhakabhashyam (One Volume Commentary) Theological Literature Society, Thiruvalla, India, 1979.
- Daivasastra Darsanam (The Theological Vision of M.M.Thomas); Viswasavum
- Prathyayasasthrvum (Faith and Ideology), Ed. Varghese George, CLS Thiruvalla.

==== Translation ====
- Pentakosthi Muthal Janana Perunalvare – Aradhana Getangal Malayalam, Translation from Syriac.
- Visudha Qurbana Thaksa; Malayalam, Translation from Syriac Text.
- Holy Qurbana; English, Translation from Syriac Text.
- Peedanubhava Aazhchayile prarthanakal, (Worship of Holy Week): Malayalam, from Syriac, Addis Ababa.
- Wedding Ceremony: According to the Order of Malankara Orthodox Church.
- Baptism Ceremony: According to the Order of Malankara Orthodox Church.
- Apposthala Pravarthikal (Acts of Apostles) Translation from Greek Text.

=== Papers in English ===
- Towards a Doctrine of the Church; Church Weekly, Alwaye, India, 1955
- Cosmos on the Church of Malabar; Church Weekly, 1955
- Christ and Creation: Religion and Society, Christian Institute for the Study of Religion and Society (CISRS) Bangalore, India, 1957.
- Religious Affirmation of Ramakrishna Movement: Religion and Society, CISRS, Bangalore, 1959.
- Vivekananda's Appraisal of Person of Jesus Christ; Chicago University, 1959
- Ramakrishna Mission and its Work; Chicago, 1960.
- A Brief Historical Survey of the Council of Chalcedon, Indian Journal of Theology (I.J.T), Calcutta, 1962
- And Church Weekly (C.W), Kottayam, India..
- Where they Monophysites?; I.J.T, Calcutta and Church Weekly Kottayam, 1962
- Doctrine of Creation; Religion and Society, CISRS, Bangalore 1962.
- One Incarnate Nature of God the Word: Greek Orthodox Theological Review, winter, 164–165, Athens, 1964
- And Does Chalcedon Divide or Unite?; Ed. Paulos Mar Gregorios, William Lazareth and Nikos A Nissiotis, World Council of Churches (WCC), 1981.
- Humanity of Christ in Christian Tradition, Orthodox Theological Review, Athens, 1967
- Euteyches and His Condemnation, Bangalore Theological Forum, United Theological College, Bangalore 1967
- Proceedings of the Council of Chalcedon, The Ecumenical Review, October 1970, Geneva and Abba Salama, 1970, Addis Ababa, Ethiopia.
- A Brief History of Efforts to Reunite the Chalcedonian and Non-Chalcedonian Sides, Greek Orthodox Theological Review, 1971
- Witness of Orthodoxy; St. Thomas 19th Centenary Souvenir, Orthodox Theological Seminary, Kottayam, 1972.(What is Orthodoxy)
- Marriage and Celibacy; Abba Salama, Addis Ababa, 1972, and Church Weekly, 28 April 1974 to 23 June 1974
- The Christology of Severus of Antioch: Abba Salama, Addis Ababa, 1973.
- The Understanding of the Christological Definition of both the Oriental Orthodox and Roman Catholic Traditions in the Light of the Post-Chalcedonian Theology: An Analysis of Terminologies in a Conceptual Framework, Wort und Wahrheit, Pro Oriente Vienna, 1973
- How can the Unity of Church be Achieved?; Uniting in Hope, Commission of Faith and Order, World Council of Churches (W.C.C), Geneva, 1976
- Christianity and Indigenization; Abba Salama, 1976 Addis Ababa
- Further Studies in the Christology of Severus of Antioch; Papers referring to the Theological Dialogue between Eastern and Oriental Orthodox Churches, Ed. Archbishop Methodios of Aksum, Athens, 1976
- An Oriental Orthodox Assessment of the First Vatican Council's Infallibility Doctrine: Wort und Wahrheit, Theological Dialogue between Roman Catholic and Oriental Orthodox Churches, Pro-Oriente, Vienna, 1978.
- Vienna consultations, Star of the East, July 1979, Kottayam, India
- The Christological basis of some Syrian Orthodox Traditions, Star of the East, July 1980.
- The Nicene Creed, its Authorship and the Faith it Conserves: Star of the East, Oct–Dec. 1981, Kottayam.
- The Trinitarian Understanding of the Christian God in Relation to Monotheism and Polytheism; WCC, Lima, 1982.
- Tradition Community and Hermeneutics; Indian Journal of Theology, Calcutta, July – December 1982.
- Eastern and Oriental Orthodox Churches: A Movement towards Church Unity; Star of the East, Kottayam, July – Sept. 1982.
- The Nicene Creed: Compared to the Apostles' Creed, the Quincunque Vult and the New Testament: The Roots of Our Faith, Ed. Hans-Georg Links, WCC Geneva, 1983.
- Our Church in History; Star of the East, Dec. 1983.
- The Mission Implications of Baptism, Eucharist and Ministry; International Review of Mission, Geneva, 1983.
- Mission in the Context of Religious Heritage: Councilor Unity, Ecumenical Christian Centre, Bangalore.
- Christian Missiological Challenges in a Society of other Religions: International Consultation of Theological Education, Gurukul, Madras.
- The International Syriac Conference, Mar Aprem and V.C.Samuel; Harp Vol.I, No1, St. Ephrem Ecumenical Research institute(SEERI), Kottayam, India.1987,
- Christology and Terminology, Harp Vol.I, No. 2&3, St. Ephrem Ecumenical Research institute(SEERI), Kottayam, India.
- A Way of Christian Unity, Harp Vol.I, No.1, SEERI, Kottayam, India
- Christology; Joint International Commission for Dialogue between the Catholic Church and the Malankara

== Books About V.C. Samuel ==
ORTHODOX IDENTITY IN INDIA: Essays in Honour of V.C. Samuel; Ed. M.K. Kuriakose, Bangalore – 1988.

Fifty Golden Years: History of Orthodox Church in Bangalore; V.C. Samuel – 1994

Malankara Sabha Pithakkanamr (Church Fathers of Malankara Sabha) Dr. Samuel Chandanappally, CDS Books, 1991

Vaidikarude Vaidikan, Commemorative Volume, Ed, Dr. K.L. Mathew Vaidyan and E.J. Varghese, Rev. Dr. V.C. Samuel Ecumenical Study Forum, Konni, 2001

Maanavikathayum Ecumenisavum Samkalina Velluvili; Prof. Ninan Koshy, Rev. Dr. V.C. Samuel Ecumenical Study Forum, Konni, 2004

Araadhanavijnaniyam, V.C. Samuel's posthumous work; Ed. E.J. Varghese, Rev. Dr. V.C. Samuel Ecumenical Study Forum, Konni, 2004

The Twain Shall Meet: Ed. Fr. V.C. Jose, Orthodox Theological Study Series, Kottayam −2013

Sapthathiyude Niravil: History of Orthodox Church Bangalore; M.S. George, Bangalore, 2014

Reenvisioning Indian Orthodox Identity: A Historico Theological Understanding of V.C. Samuel, Dr. Ninan K. George, ISPCK, Delhi-2015.

== Sources ==
- The Council of Chalcedon Re-Examined: Father V.C.Samuel; For the Senate of Serampore College;

Christian Literature Society, Madras, 1977; British Orthodox Press, ISBN 1-4010-1644-8, 2001

- A Brief Life History of Father V.C.Samuel: Sunny Kulathakka; Ed. Kuriakose, M.K; Orthodox Identity in India: Essays in Honour of V.C. Samuel; Rev. Dr. V.C. Samuel 75th Birth Day Celebration Committee, Bangalore – 1988
- Ente Chintha Vikasanam (Evolution of My Thinking); Autobiographical piece, Church Weekly, Alwaye, India. 1954.
- Malayala Manorama Daily; Nov.19, 1998.
- Ecumenical Contribution of V.C.Samuel; Sebastian, J. Jayakiran; Thomas, T.K; Ecumenical Review, 1 January 1999, WCC, Geneva.
- The Oriental Orthodox Churches Addis Ababa Conference January 1965: Samuel, V.C: Ed, Addis Ababa, August 1965.
- Fifty Golden Years: Samuel, V.C: Bangalore, 1994.
- Vaidikarude Vaidikan: Rev.Dr.V.C.SamuelCommemorative Volume; Mathew Vaidyan, K.L, Fr.Dr.: Chief Editor, Varghese E.J, Editor, Ecumenical Forum, Konni, Kerala, India.
