= Dioscorus Kuriakose =

Indian bishop (born 1957)

His Grace Mor Dioscorus Kuriakose Abbot of Malecuriz Dayro & Metropolitan of Simhasana Churches in North Kerala
- Church: Syrian Orthodox Church
- Diocese: Metropolitan of Simhasana Churches in North Kerala
- See: Holy Apostolic See of Antioch & All East

Orders
- Ordination: 06 May 1988 (Kassisso) by Osthatheos Thomas
- Consecration: 8 December 2002 by Patriarch Ignatius Zakka I
- Rank: Metropolitan

Personal details
- Born: May 11, 1957 Ernakulam
- Education: B.A, B.D from St.James Seminary, Perumpally M.Th from United Theological College, Bangalore
- Alma mater: Serampore University

Mor Dioscorus Kuriakose (born 11 May 1957) is a Syriac Orthodox bishop, currently the Abbot of Malecuriz Dayro and Metropolitan of Simhasana Churches in North Kerala. Kuriakose belongs to the Ponnamkuzhy family, Arakunnam.

== Education ==
Kuriakose graduated with B.A degree. He joined St.James Seminary, Perumpally for theological Studies and obtained Bachelor of Divinity Degree. Later he studied at Bangalore and obtained Masters in Theology(M.Th) from United Theological College, Bangalore of Serampore University.
