= Indian Journal of Theology =

- Discipline: Christian theology
- Language: English
- Edited by: V.C. Samuel, Pratap Chandra Gine, V. J. John

Publication details
- History: 1952-2004
- Publisher: Bishop's College and Serampore College (India)
- Frequency: Biannual

Standard abbreviations
- ISO 4: Indian J. Theol.

Indexing
- ISSN: 0019-5685
- LCCN: sa64006264
- OCLC no.: 1752931

Links
- Journal homepage; Online archive

The Indian Journal of Theology was a biannual peer-reviewed academic journal of Christian theology. It was established in 1952 and the last issue appeared in 2004. It was published by Bishop's College, Calcutta) and the theology department at Serampore College. The editors-in-chief were V.C. Samuel (1960-1963), Pratap Chandra Gine, and V. J. John.

== Abstracting and indexing ==
The journal was abstracted and indexed in the ATLA Religion Database.
