= Curien Kaniamparambil =

Indian Jacobite Syrian Christian priest (1946–2015)

Very Rev. Dr Arch Corepiscopo Curien (Kurian) Kaniyamparambil
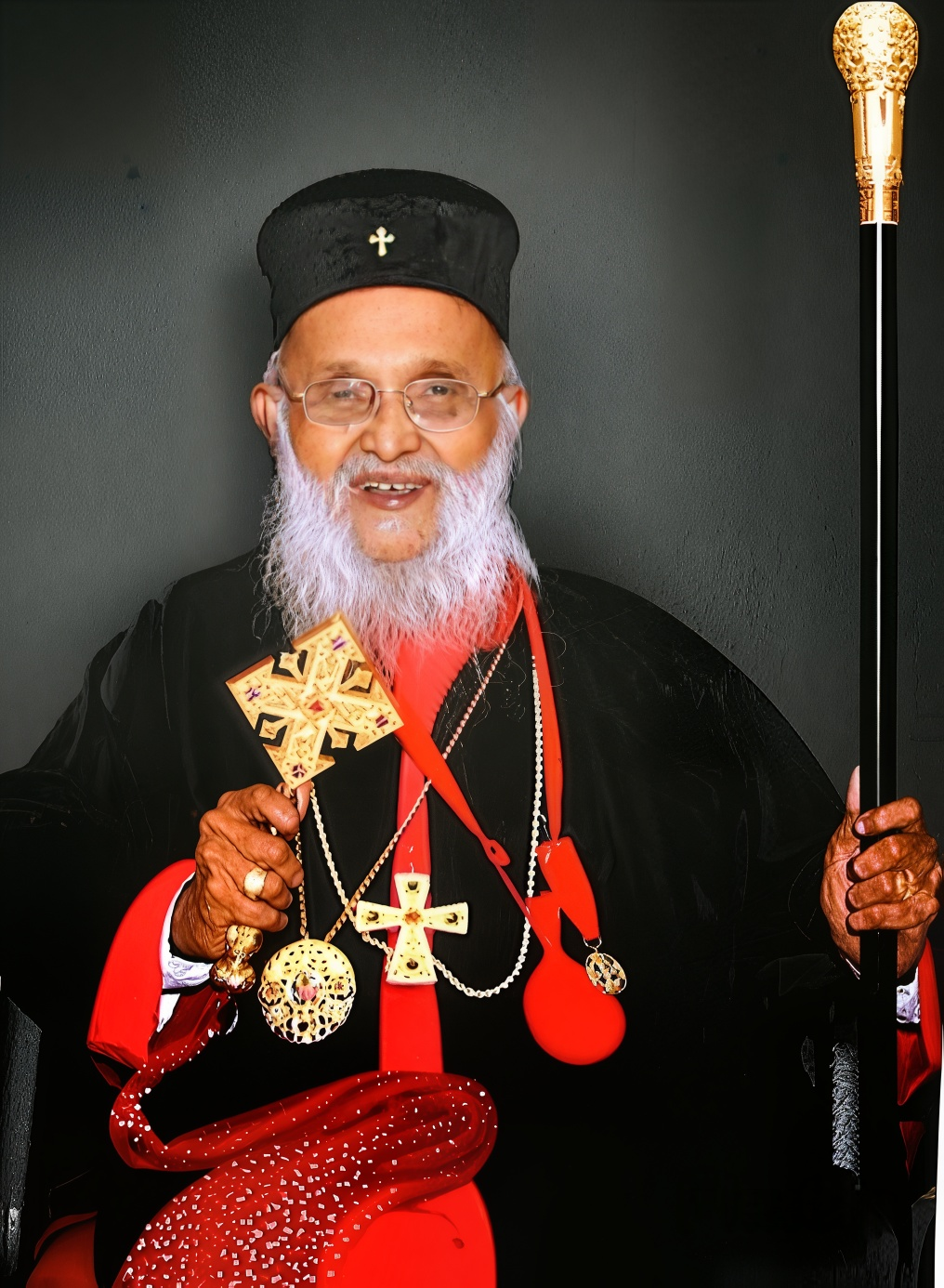
- Born: 27 February 1913; Kanjiramattom, British Raj
- Died: 19 October 2015 (aged 102); Kanjiramattom, Kerala, India
- Resting place: St Ignatius Jacobite Syrian Church Kanjiramattom
- Other names: Malankara Malpan, Malankara Ezhuthachan
- Occupations: Priest, Scholar
- Notable work: Bible translation into Malayalam
- Spouse: Saramma (Ammini)

Malankara Malpan Curien Kaniyamparambil, alternatively spelled Kurian Kaniyamparambil, was a Priest Trustee and arch-chorebishop in the Malankara Jacobite Syriac Orthodox Church and a scholar of the Syriac language, who translated the Bible from the Syriac Peshitta text to Malayalam. This is the official bible translation used by Malankara Jacobite Syriac Orthodox Church.

== Biography ==
Kaniyamparambil Achan was born on 27 February 1913 to Paulose and Aayamma of a well-known Christian family Kaniyamparambil in Kanjiramattom. He did education in the schools at Kanjiramattom and Mulanthuruthy. Later he started learning the basics of Jacobite liturgy, Syriac and theology from Very Rev. Augen Ramban at Sion Kodanad. At the age of 15 he was able to master the sacred liturgical language Syriac. He completed his college education from C.M.S College, Kottayam.

He was ordained as a priest by Malankara Metropolitan Paulose Mar Athanasius. During the apostolic visit of Patriarch of Antioch Saint Ignatius Elias III to Malankara, he served as his secretary. Apostolic Delegate of the Patriarch Mor Julius Elias raised him to the rank of Corepiscopa at the age of 37, the highest order the Church bestows on a married Kassisso. He also received many titles and medals from Moran Mor Aphrem I, Moran Mor Yakoob III, and Moran Mor Zakka I Iywas, Holy Patriarchs of Antioch and all the East.

== Death ==
Kaniyamparambil Achan died at age 102 on 19 October 2015. The remains of Rev. (Dr.) Kurien Arch Corepiscopa, Kaniyamparambil are interred in a tomb in St.Ignatius Jacobite Syrian Church in Kanjiramattom, Ernakulam District, Kerala.

== Books ==
- Holy Bible (വിശുദ്ധഗ്രന്ഥം) (translation into Malayalam)
- Interpretation of the new testament (Malayalam)
- Sh'himo Namaskaram in Malayalam,1976
- Syriac Reader and Meditative Lectures
- Suriyani Sabha Charithravum Viswasa Sathyangalum (Malayalam)(History of Jacobite Syrian Church(English))
- The miracle's of our lord
- Vidhudha Vishwasa Pramanam
- Biography of Chathuruthil Mor Geevarghese Mar Gregorios of Parumala
- Biography of Ignatius Elias III Patriarch of Antioch
- Biography of Baselios Yeldo Maphrian of the East
- Biography of Baselios Sakralla III of Aleppo, Maphrian of the East
- Anchu Parishudhanmar
- Biography of Malankara Metropolitan Paulose Mar Athanasius
- 1001 speeches
- Rekshikkapeduvan Nee Enthu Cheyyanam (Malayalam)
- Prayers of Mother Mary
- 10 letters of Mother to the Daughter
- Syrian Church History in India (English & Malayalam)
- Joseph (Syriac drama)
- Margonino (Syriac novel)
- Subhashithanagal (Speech)
- The Miracles of Our Lord
- Syriac-English Dictionary
- 151 Speeches along with the history of the Holy Church

== Awards and recognition ==
Title	Year
First Benjamin Bailey award instituted by the Madhya Kerala diocese of Church of South India by Kerala Sahithya Academy chairman Perumbadavam Sreedharan	2013
Patriarch Moran Mor Ignatius Zakka-I granted the position of REESH COREPISCOPO held at the Syrian Church headquarters of India at Puthencruz, Ernakulam and the title MTARGMONO D EETHO and also awarded the St:Ignatius Medal and Certificate.	2012
Priest Trustee of the Syriac Orthodox Church, India	1975 to 1994 1997 to 2012
The title of Sophar was bestowed on him by the St. Ephrem Ecumenical Research Institute (SEERI), Kottayam, during the World Syriac Conference.	1998
The 'Visudha Grantham' (Holy Bible translated from Peshito Syriac) was released on 2 August, by Catholicos Mor Baselios Paulose II	1994
The Association of the Syriac Academics, Stockholm, Sweden, congratulated and presented its symbolic prize (certificate).	1993
Catholicos of the East Aboon Mor Baselios Paulose II awarded him the title 'Nathaniel'	1982
Patriarch Moran Mor Ignatius Zakka I granted him the title 'Korooso Dasroro'	1982
Degree of Doctor of Divinity (Honoris Causa) was conferred on him by the St.Ephrem Institute, Solna, Sweden.	1979
Patriarch Moran Mor Ignatius Yakoob III granted him the eminent title of 'Malankara Malpan'	1978
Patriarch Moran Mor Ignatius Yakoob III honoured him with the St.Ephrem the Syrian Medal	1966
Blessed by Patriarch Moran Mor Ignatius Aphrem with the Mor Yakoob Medal	1954
