= St. Ignatius Monastery Manjinikkara =

Church in Omalloor, India

Manjanikara Dayara
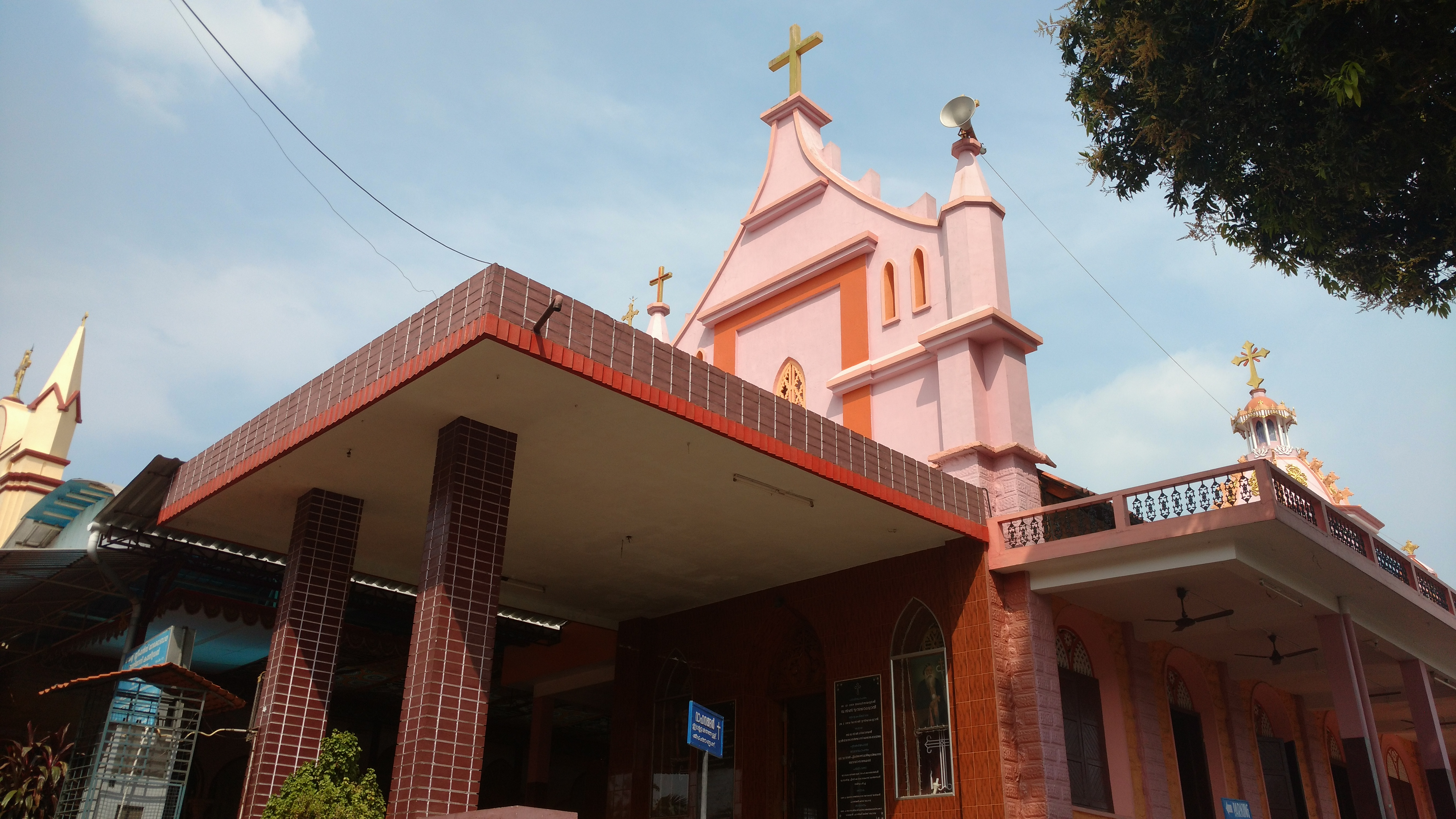
- Manjanikara Dayara
- Location: (India) Omalloor
- Denomination: Syriac Orthodox Church
- Tradition: Syriac, Malayalam

History
- Founded: 15-12-1925
- Founder(s): Skaria Malpan Elavinamannil; Dayro:Mor Yulios Elias Qoro
- Other dedication: Ignatius Elias III Patriarch of Antioch

Administration
- Diocese: Simhasana diocese

Manjanikkara Dayara is a monastery of the Syriac Orthodox Church in India. It is situated at the top of the hillock in Manjanikkara, near Omallur, Pathanamthitta District, in South Kerala.

The monastery was established by Mor Yulios Elias Qoro, Patriarchal delegate to the Malankara Church. The Manjanikkara Dayro is the seat of the Patriarchal Delegate to Malankara and the metropolitan of the Simhasana churches (churches administered directly by the Patriarchate).

== History ==
On 11 February 1932, at the invitation of Kashisho Kuriakos Elavinamannil, the Patriarch Ignatius Elias III arrived at the Manjinikara Mor Stephanos church from Kallissery. On arriving at Manjinikara, the Patriarch said, "This place offers us much comfort; we desire to remain here permanently." He died there on 13 February.

Different opinions arose regarding the final resting place for the Patriarch—a situation that the church in Malankara never had to confront before. It was decided to inter his body in a plot of land to the north of the Mor Stephanos church, the title deed of which was transferred to the Patriarchate. On 14 February, the funeral services for the patriarch were held there.

The Mor Ignatios Dayro Church was built by the Patriarchal delegate Mor Yulios Elias Qoro over the tomb of the Patriarch. The memory of the Patriarch is preserved by the Syriac Orthodox Church, especially in Malankara where thousands of pilgrims reach the tomb by foot on the annual feast day, 13 February, from all over the world. Ignatius Elias is the only Patriarch of Antioch whose body is interred in Malankara.

On 20 October 1987, Patriarch Mor Ignatius Zakka I Iwas through encyclical E265/87 permitted the Church in Malankara to remember his name in the fifth diptych.

The remains of Mor Yulius Elias Qoro and Mor Yulius Yacoub, former Patriarchal delegates to Malankara, are also interred in the church.

== Seminary ==
The Mor Ignatios Dayro church is worked as the seminary school for a long time for the Jacobite Syrian Christian Church under the leadership of Mor Yulios Elias Qoro. As numerous seminarians studied and understood the teachings of holy fathers promoted by the same faith and same church and part of the Syriac Orthodox Church.

=== Scholars ===
- Father V. C. Samuel - Famous Theologian & Scholar of Malankara Orthodox Syrian Church. He played an important role in the ecumenical & scholarly activities of the church.
- Curien Kaniamparambil - Curien Kaniamparambil is the Great Scholar of the Jacobite Syrian Christian Church. He written many books and converted Peshitta into the Malayalam is known as Vishudha Grandham(വിശുദ്ധഗ്രന്ഥം).

== Gallery ==
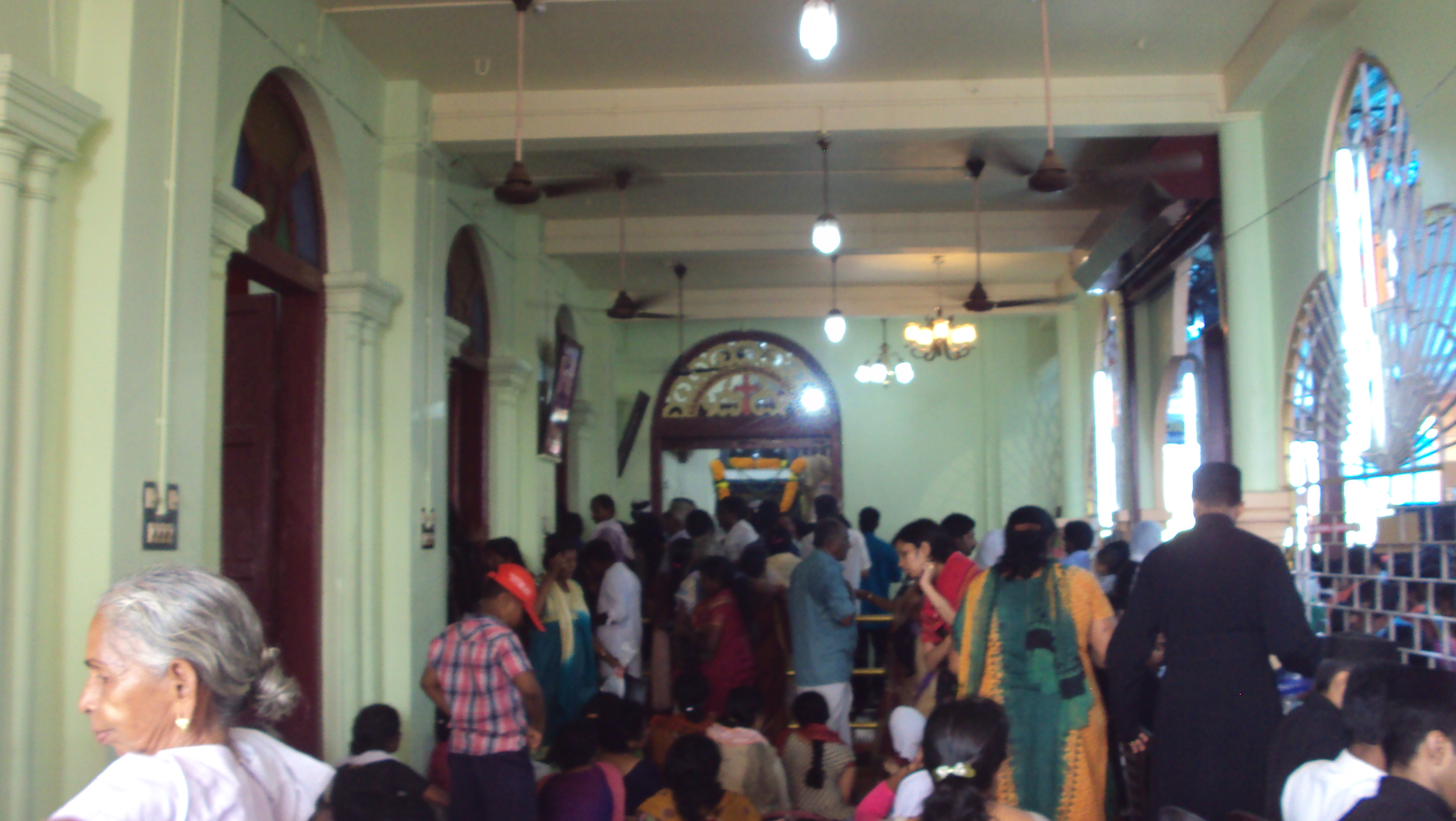
Tomb of Ignatius Elias III

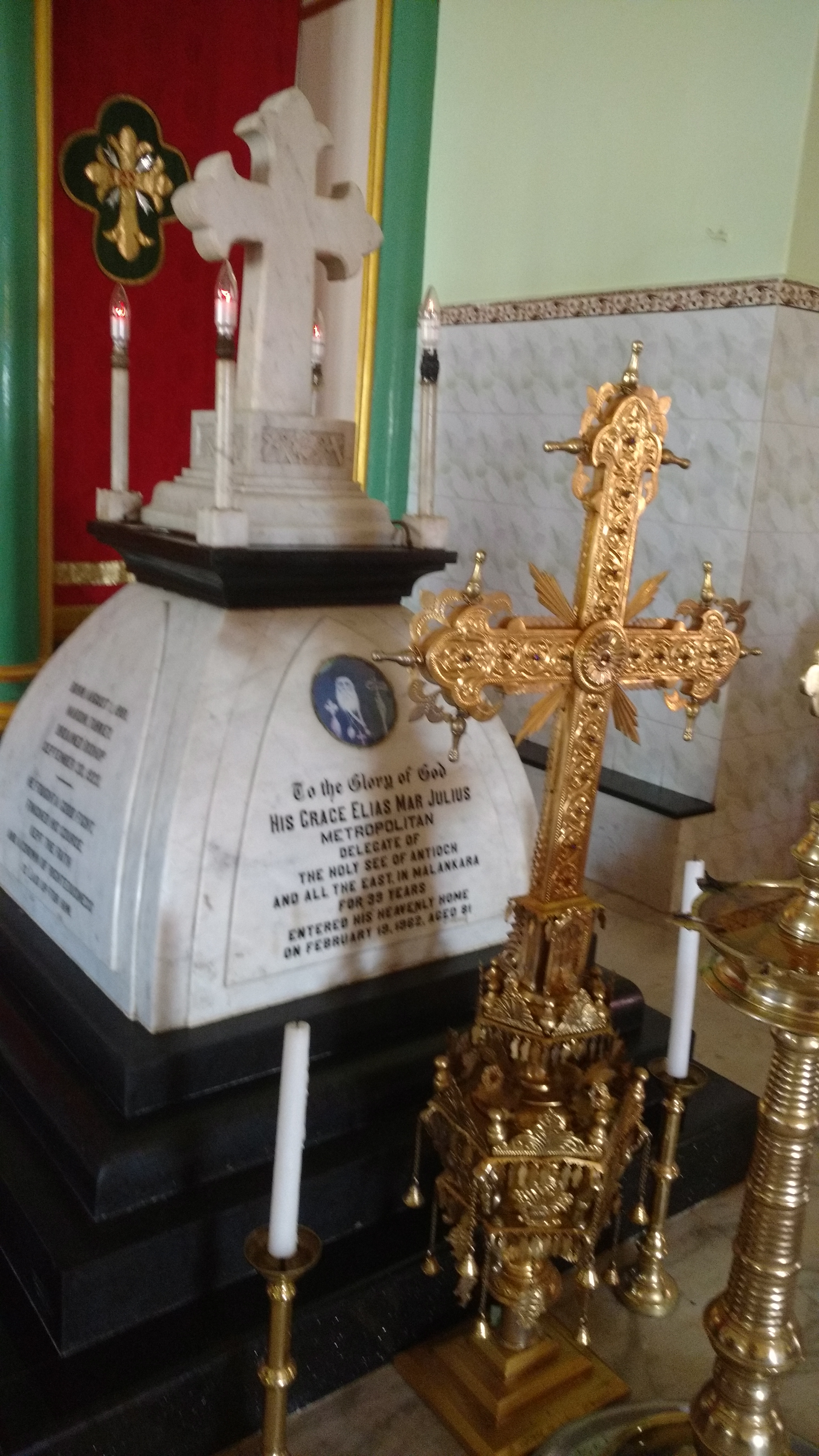
Tomb of Mor Yulios Elias Qoro.

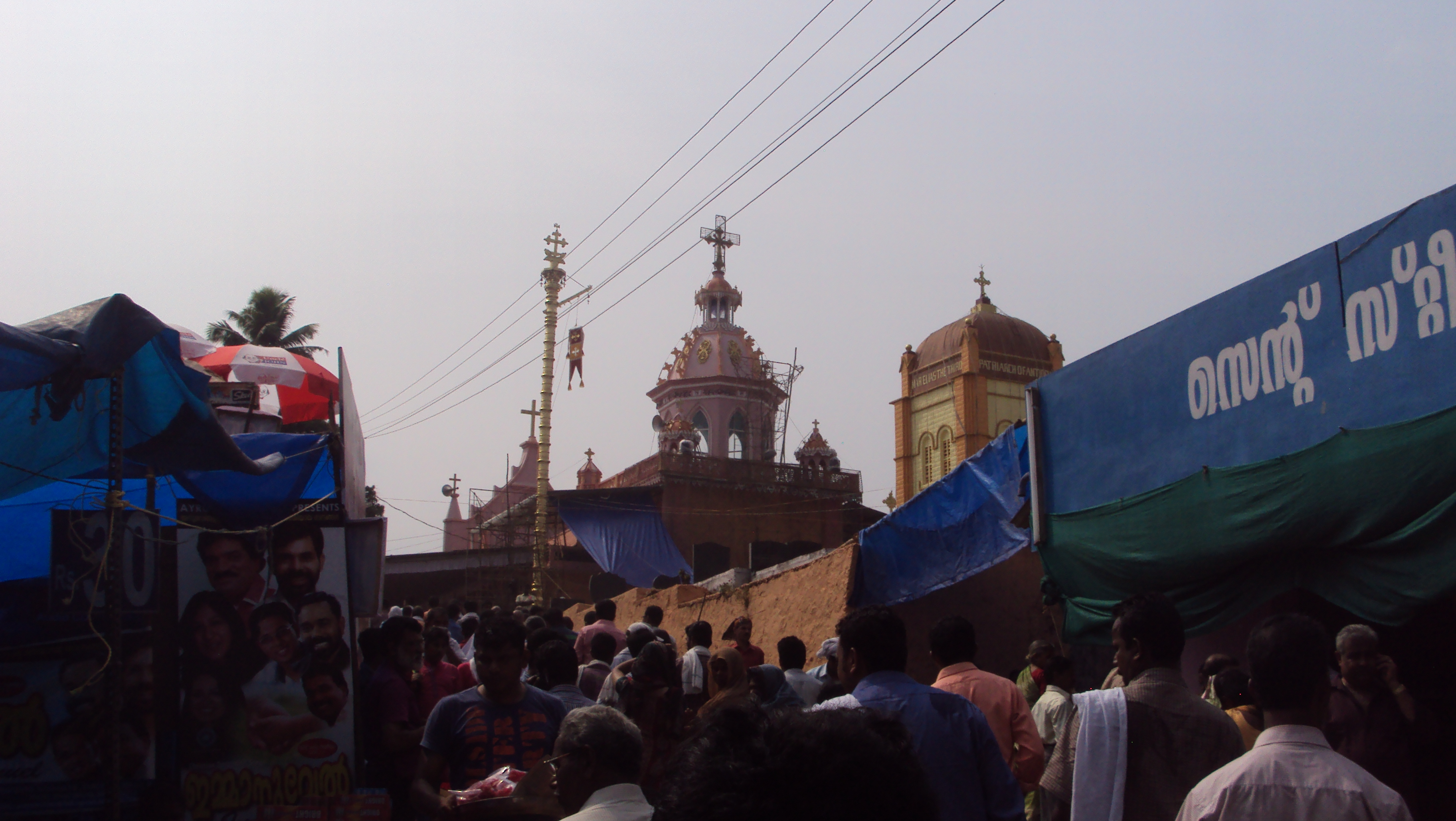
Feast and Foot Pilgrimage.
