= Holy Trinity Church, Bengaluru =

Anglican church in Karnataka, India

Holy Trinity Church
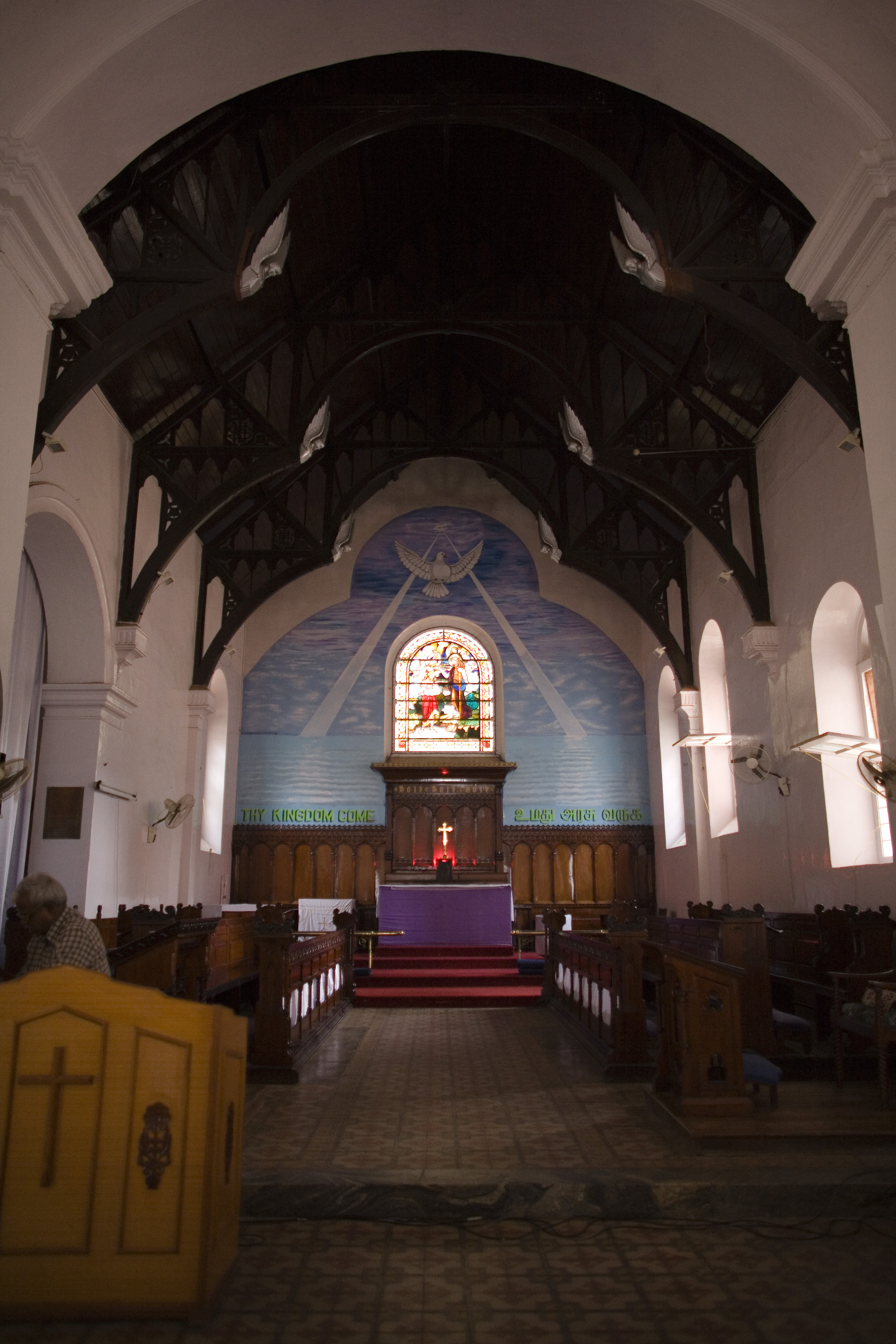
- Holy Trinity Church
- 12.972118°N 77.620622°E
- Location: Bangalore Urban, Karnataka
- Country: India

History
- Dedicated: 8 August 1852
- Consecrated: 25 July 1852

Architecture
- Functional status: Active
- Style: English Renaissance

Specifications
- Capacity: 700

Holy Trinity Church, located at Trinity circle at the east end of the MG Road, is an Anglican church and a major landmark in Bengaluru. It was built in 1851, for the British Regiment stationed there. Built in the English Renaissance style, the church can accommodate 700 people and is regarded as the largest "military" church in southern India. It has a congregation of over 450 families

== History ==
The East India Company decided to build a second church in Bangalore after protests from local English regiment in Bangalore. Bishop Corrie chose the spot of the church. The foundation stone was laid on 16 February 1848. The walls were lined with ornate marble murals and tablets, which spoke about great men and women who toiled for the church. Some of these statues were specially carved in England. Rev W W Lutyens designed the furnishing and embellishments. Mears Foundry of London cast the bell of the church, in 1847. The pulpit and pipe organ were also built in London. The pipe organ was later sold to a congregation of the Tamil Evangelical Lutheran Church. The stained glass, depicting the baptism of Jesus in splendid color, and the baptismal pond were brought from London. Queen Victoria's own West Kent Regiment presented the cross, in memory of those who died when the unit was based in Bangalore.

The church was consecrated on 25 July 1852 and opened on 8 August 1852. The original estimate of the construction was ₹27,000 (US$290). However, the archdeacon suggested improvements at an additional cost of ₹6,500 (US$69).

After Independence, the church was taken over by the Christian Indian Military personnel and their families. It was called Holy Trinity Garrison Pastorate then. In 1965, it was renamed as Holy Trinity Church, by the Mysore Diocese of the Church of South India. It was renovated at the cost of around ₹25 lakh (US$26,000) in 2003

== Vintage Gallery ==
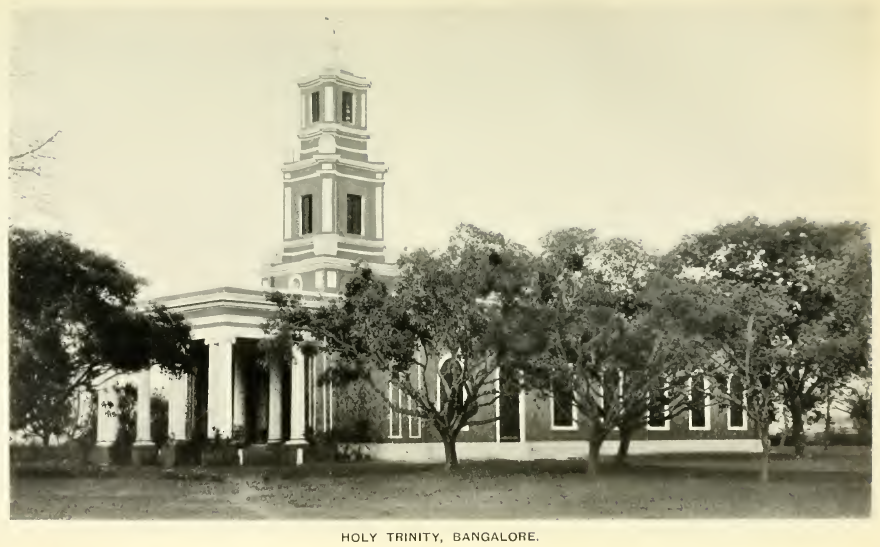
Holy Trinity Church, Bangalore (1922), from Rev. Frank Penny's Book 'The Church in Madras, Volume III'
