= Yulios Elias Qoro =

Syriac Orthodox bishop (1881–1962)

Mār Yulios Elias Qoro
- Third Patriarchal Delegate to Malankara
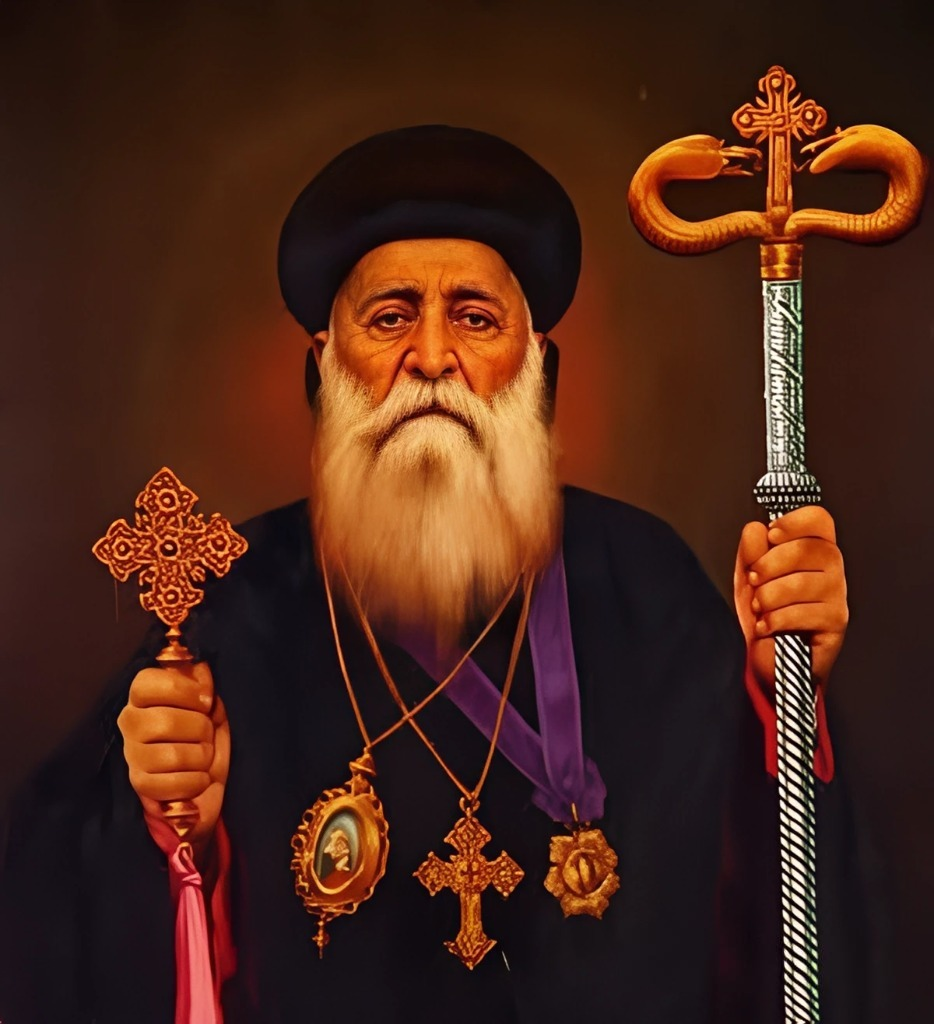
- Portrait of Mor Yulios Elias Qoro
- Church: Syriac Orthodox Patriarchate of Antioch
- See: Syriac Orthodox Church
- In office: 39 Years
- Predecessor: Athanasius Stephanos
- Successor: Coorilos Yuyakkim

Orders
- Ordination: 23 September 1923
- Consecration: by Ignatius Elias III

Personal details
- Born: Elias Yulios Qoro; 1 August 1881 Mardin, Turkey
- Died: 19 February 1962 (aged 80) Omallur, Kerala
- Buried: Mor Ignatius Dayro Manjinikkara
- Education: Dayro d-Kurkmo (Mor Hananyo Monastery), Beth Gazo D-ne`motho

Yulios Elias Qoro (1 August 1881 – 19 February 1962), born Elias Malke Qoro, was a monk, bishop, and scholar in the Syriac Orthodox Church. Born in Mardin, he devoted his life to serving the church, especially in India, where he served as bishop. He had become a teacher to many prominent figures after him until his death and burial at the Manjanikkara Dayara.

== Life ==
Born Elias Malke Qoro on 1 August 1881, in Mardin, he studied at the Church of the Forty Martyrs of Sebaste there. He joined Mor Hananyo Monastery in 1902 and became a monk on 16 June 1905. A year later in 1906, he was appointed secretary to Patriarch Ignatius Abded Aloho II, and ordained as a priest in 1908. From 1908 to 1911, he accompanied the Patriarch on trips to Jerusalem, Istanbul, London, Paris, Egypt, and India. During his time in London, he met King Edward VII twice and dined with him. In 1911, he became the abbot of his alma mater, Mor Hananyo Monastery, and was also appointed director of its printing press. Elias was consecrated as a bishop on 23 September 1923, in the Church of the Forty Martyrs by Patriarch Elias III, receiving the honorific title Julius (Syriac: ܝܘܠܝܘܣ, romanized: Yūlīyōs).

=== Episcopate ===
He was later appointed to serve in Malankara, eventually becoming Patriarchal Delegate in 1927. On the burial site of Ignatius Elias III in Omallu, Kerala, he established a monastery named after him, called "Dayro d-Mor Ignatius", in addition to many other churches and monasteries. He died on 19 February 1962 and was buried in that monastery at Manjinikkara.

=== Legacy and Influence ===
Elias was among the leading experts in the Beth Gazo melodies. His student, Patriarch Ignatius Yaʿqub III, later created audio recordings of the Beth Gazo, which continue to be valuable educational resources for the clergy. Elias taught Abd al-Masih Nu'man Qarabashi the Syriac language; Qarabashi was an influential scholar and teacher in this field.

== Gallery ==
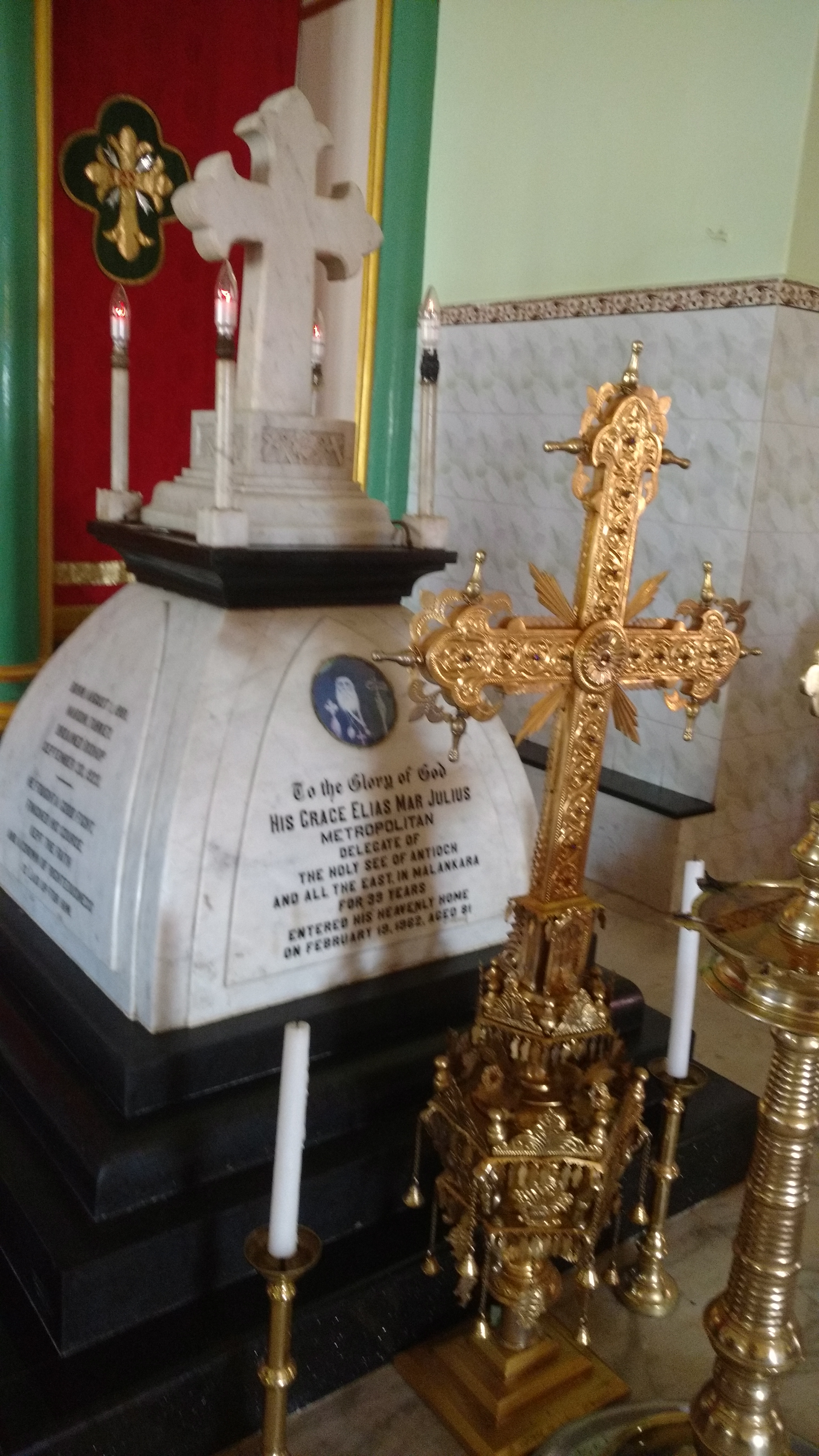
Tomb of Yulios Elias Qoro

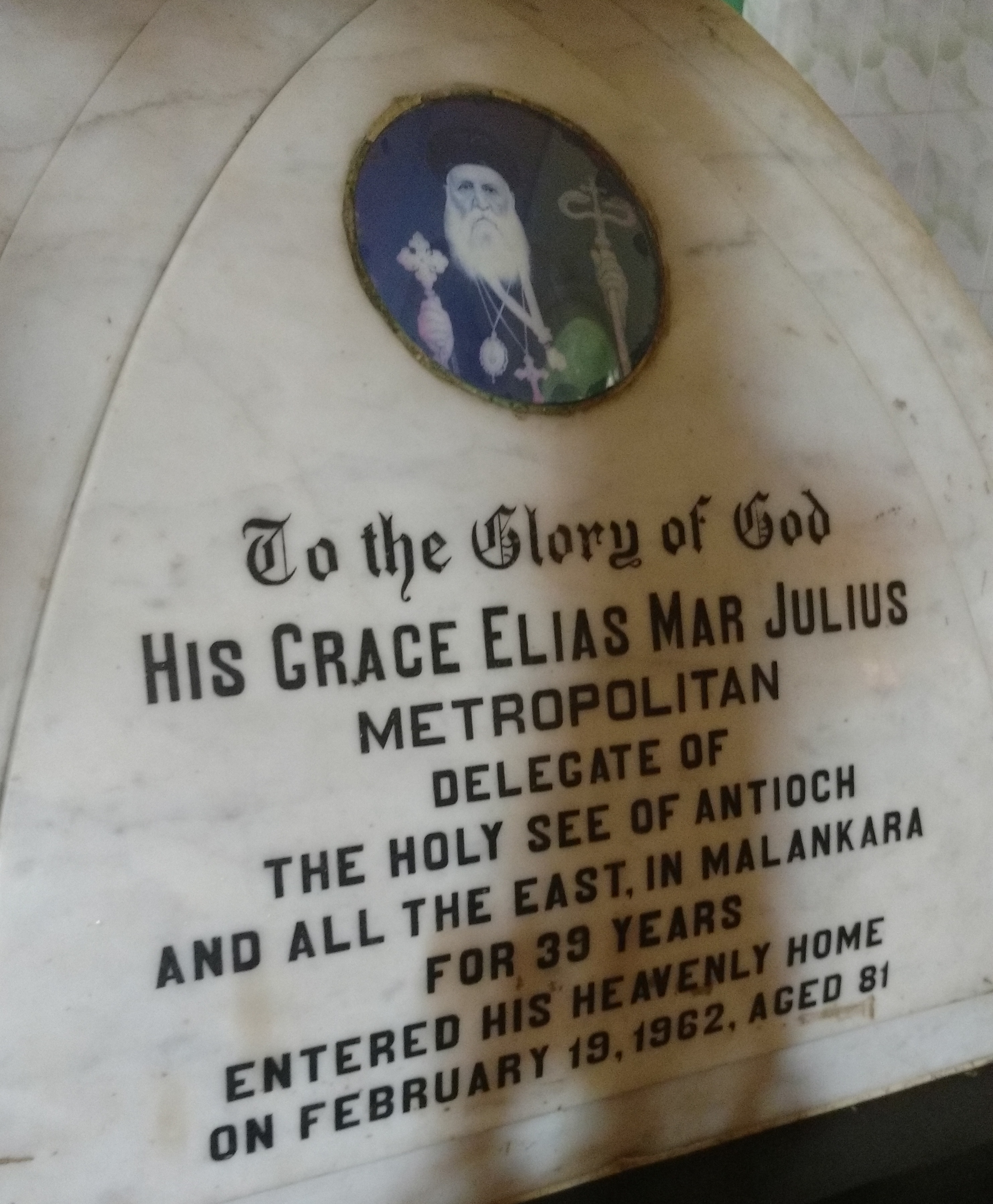
Closeup of the tomb

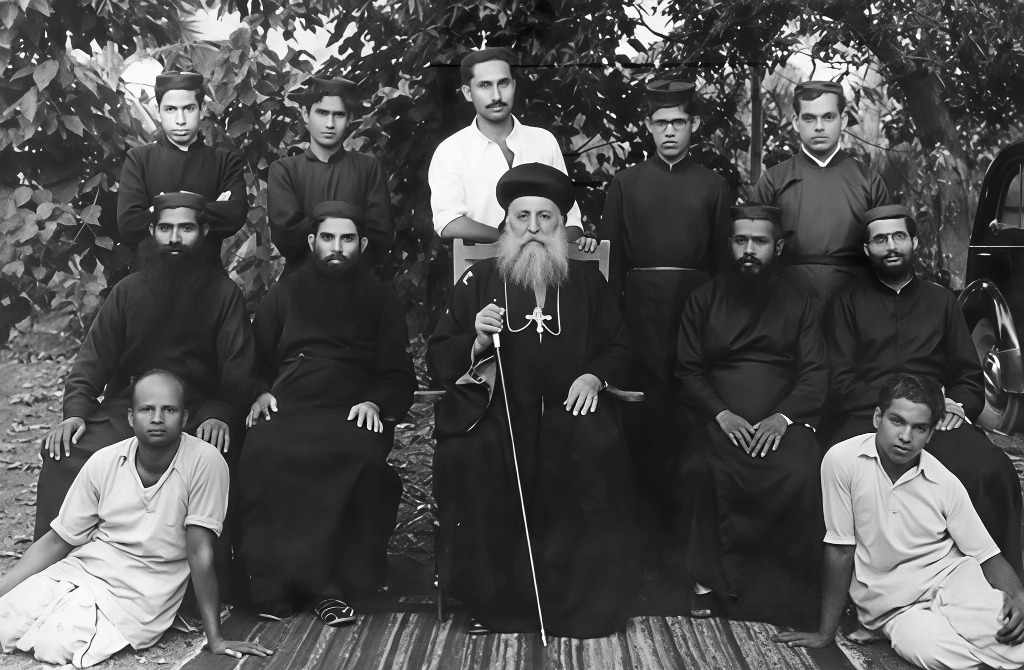
Mor Elias Yulios Qoro and his disciples

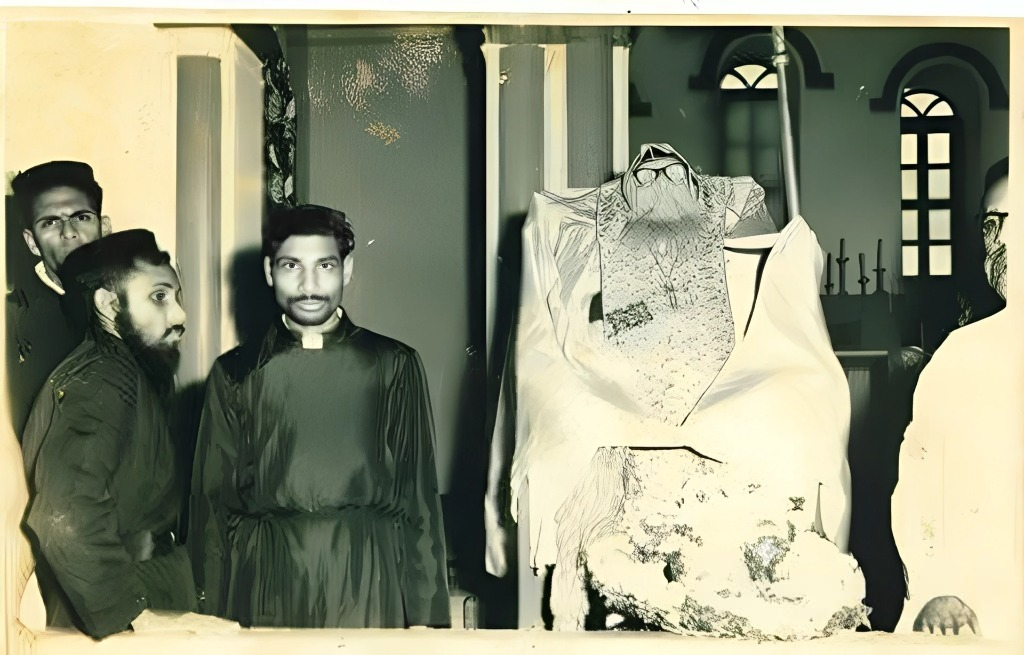
The last liturgical service of Mor Elias Yulios Qoro

== Sources ==
- Kiraz, George A. (2011). Brock, Sebastian P.; Butts, Aaron Michael; Kiraz, George A.; Rompay, Lucas Van (eds.). Gorgias Encyclopedic Dictionary of the Syriac Heritage. Gorgias Press, LLC. ISBN 9781593337148.

'Malankara Syriac Orthodox Church Titles
Preceded by Athanasius Paulose	Patriarchal Delegate of India; 1953–1957	Succeeded by Clemis Abraham
