= Ignatius Elias III =

Saint and 119th Patriarch of Syriac Orthodox Church of Antioch (1917–1932)

His Holiness Moran Mor Saint Ignatius Elias III Patriarch of Antioch and All the East
- 119th Patriarch of the Universal Syriac Orthodox Church
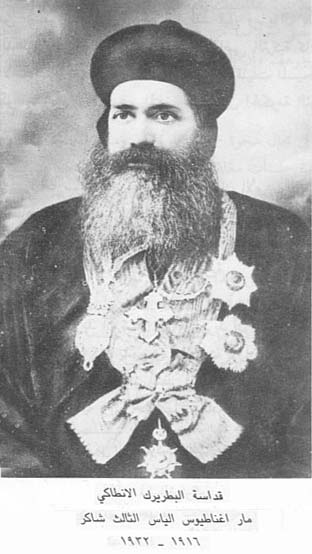
- Church: Syriac Orthodox Church
- See: Antioch
- Installed: 1917
- Term ended: 1932
- Predecessor: Ignatius Abded Aloho II
- Successor: Ignatius Aphrem I Barsoum
- Previous posts: Archbishop of Amid, Archbishop of Mosul

Personal details
- Born: Nasri; 13 October 1867 Mardin, Diyarbekir Vilayet, Ottoman Empire
- Died: 13 February 1932 (aged 64) Manjanikkara Dayara, Travancore, British India
- Residence: The Monastery of St. Ananias
- Parents: Chorepiscopo Abraham and Mary

Sainthood
- Feast day: 13 February
- Venerated in: Syriac Orthodox Church; Jacobite Syrian Christian Church; Oriental Orthodox Christianity
- Title as Saint: Saint Ignatius Elias III
- Canonized: 1987 by Ignatius Zakka I Iwas
- Shrines: St. Stephen's Cathedral, Manjanikkara, India

St. Ignatius Elias III (Syriac: ܐܝܓܢܛܝܘܣ ܐܠܝܐܣ ܬܠܝܬܝܐ, born Nasri, 13 October 1867 – 13 February 1932) was the 119th Patriarch of Antioch, and head of the Syriac Orthodox Church from 1917 until his death in 1932.

He is known for his visit to Malankara to resolve the dispute between the two factions of the Malankara church. He died before he could complete his mission and was buried in outside the St. Stephen's church in Majnikkara. He was canonised as a saint by Ignatius Zakka I in 1987.

== Early life and ascension to Patriarch ==
Nasri was born on October 13, 1867, in the city of Mardin, son of Chorepiscopus Abraham and Mary, and had four brothers and three sisters. He was cared for by his eldest sister Helena upon the death of his mother, and as a teenager he worked as a goldsmith. He also worked for the Ottoman government for three months. Following the direction of Patriarch Ignatius Peter IV, Nasri joined the Forty Martyrs Seminary, and in 1887, he joined the Monastery of Mor Hananyo near Mardin and was ordained deacon by Peter IV. The following year, Nasri became a novice before becoming a monk in 1889, upon which he assumed the name Elias.

Elias was ordained priest in 1892 by Peter IV along with Osthatheos Saleeba. And during the Massacres of Diyarbakır in 1895, Elias gave refuge to approximately 7000 Armenian refugees in the Monastery of Mor Quryaqos. After this, Elias was appointed Chief of the Monastery of Mor Quryaqos and Monastery of Mor Hananyo. In 1908, Elias was consecrated bishop of Amid by Patriarch Ignatius Abded Aloho II, upon which he took the name Iwanius.

In 1912, he was transferred to Mosul where he served until his elevation to the patriarchate in 1917. After the death of the Patriarch Abded Aloho II in 1915, Mor Iwanius was elected patriarch and assumed the throne in 1917. The decree was issued by the Ottoman Sultan Mehmed VI and was confirmed in Elias' visit to Constantinople in 1919, during which he also received the Ismania medal. Elias travelled extensively in 1919 to visit surviving Syriac Orthodox communities in the Middle East in the aftermath of the Assyrian genocide. As a result of the end of the Turkish War of Independence in 1922, Elias was forced to flee the traditional patriarchal residence at the Monastery of Mor Hananyo to Jerusalem where he resided for three months.

In 1919, Elias III sent a delegation to the Paris Peace Conference with a list of requests to engage in foreign relations. When the Turkish Republic was formed, Elias III extended his loyalty to safeguard the Syriac Orthodox Patriarchate in Turkey. Later, It was removed by the Republic citing it as a "potential threat".

During this time Elias established a printing press for the church, and in 1925, Elias travelled to Aleppo and Mosul to establish printing presses there also.

== Malankara visitation ==
Elias held a synod in 1930 at the Monastery of Mar Mattai, near Mosul, to restructure the organisation of the church and its dioceses. Later that year, on 1 December, Elias received a request from Lord Irwin, Viceroy of India, to help resolve a schism within the Malankara Church. Despite cautions from his doctor and eldest sister, Elias left Mosul on 6 February 1931, accompanied by Mor Clemis Yuhanon Abbachi, Rabban Quryaqos, Rabban Yeshu Samuel, Zkaryo Shakir, and Elias Ghaduri, despite his cardiac problems.

Elias and his entourage left from the city of Basra on 28 February and arrived at Karachi on 5 March 1931 where they were received by Patriarchal Delegate Mor Yulius Elias Qoro, Mor Athanasius Paulos of Aluva, as well as other clergymen. Elias then proceeded to Delhi the following day and arrived on 8 March. He met with Lord Irwin in Delhi before leaving to Madras where he was received as a guest of the governor, Sir George Frederick Stanley. Elias arrived in Malankara on 21 March and was received by Dionysius Mikhail and Dioscoros Tuma along with a large crowd of believers.

Upon his arrival, Elias III was approached by the excommunicated Dionysius Gurgis who offered homage and pledged his obedience. The patriarch blessed him and lifted him from his anathema. The patriarch then held meetings between the two factions within the church at Aluva, Karingachira, Panampady and Kuruppumpady for the remainder of the year along with Dionysius Gurgis.

Despite failing to end the schism, Elias remained in India until February 1932 when he died at the Church of St. Ignatius Monastery Manjinikkara on 13 February. The remains of the patriarch were interred in St. Ignatius Monastery Manjinikkara.

55 years after his death, in 1987, his successor Patriarch Ignatius Zakka I officially declared him a saint. His feast day is observed on 13 February.

== Episcopal succession ==
During Ignatius Elias time as Patriarch and Metropolitan, he had the duty to ordain and consecrate many Metropolitans in the Syria Orthodox church in addition to hundreds of priests, monks, and deacons. The list includes one future patriarch also. He ordained nine bishops in the period from 1923 to 1927

1. Severus Aphram Barsoum (1918–1933). Metropolitan of Syria and Lebanon. Later, he was elected as Ignatius Aphrem I, the 120th Patriarch of Syriac Orthodox Church (1933–1957).
2. Gregorios Gabriel (1923). Metropolitan of Jerusalem
3. Clement Yuhanna Abaji (1923–1949). Metropolitan of Mor Mattai Monastery then moved to few other dioceses
4. Iwanis Yuhanna Kandur (1923). Metropolitan for the Patriarchale Office. Later, in 1933, he was appointed as Metropolitan of Beirut and Damascus.
5. Julius Elias (1923). Eccumenical Metropolitan
6. Timothy Thomas (1923). Metropolitan of Tur Abdin
7. Dionysius Michael (1926). Metropolitan of Kottayam-Malabar, India
8. Dioscuros Thomas (1926). Metropolitan of Knanaya Archdiocese, India.
9. Cyril Michael (1926). Metropolitan of the Patriarchal Office
10. Timotheos Augin (1926). Metropolitan in Kandanad, Malabar, India

== See also ==
- Manjanikkara Dayara
- Jacob Baradaeus
- Malankara Jacobite Syriac Orthodox Church
- Ignatius Zakka I Iwas
- Ignatius Aphrem I Barsoum
- Polycarpus Eugene (Augin) Aydin

Preceded by Ignatius Abded Aloho II	List of Syriac Orthodox Patriarchs of Antioch; 1917–1932	Succeeded by Ignatius Aphrem I Barsoum
