= Philaxinos Samuel =

Indian bishop

Mor Philaxinos Samuel
- Former Metropolitan of Malabar Diocese
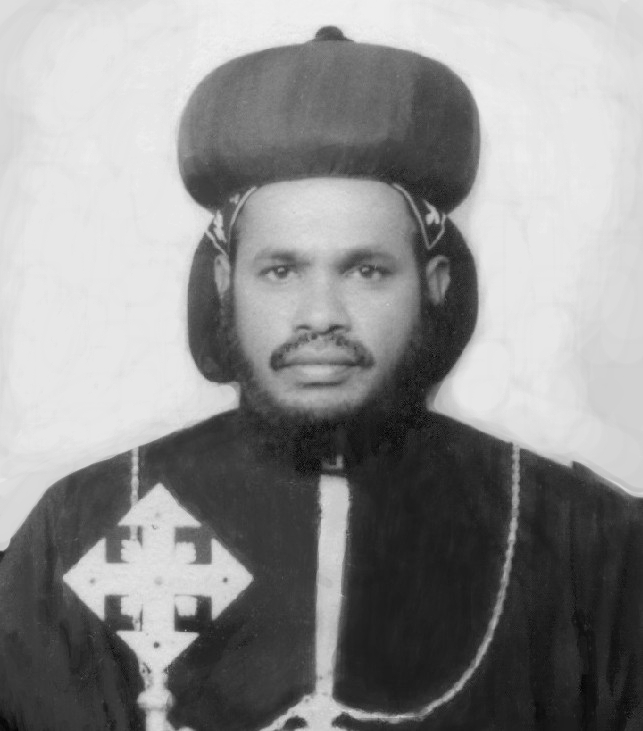
- Church: Malankara Jacobite Syrian Orthodox Church
- Diocese: Malabar Diocese
- See: Universal Syriac Orthodox Patriarchate of Antioch
- In office: 1976 — 1985
- Predecessor: Baselios Thomas I and Geevarghese Mar Gregorios
- Successor: Yuhanon Mor Philaxinos

Orders
- Ordination: 26 December 1975 by Catholicose Baselios Paulose II
- Consecration: 6 January 1976 by Catholicose Baselios Paulose II
- Rank: Metropolitan of Malabar Diocese

Personal details
- Born: 4 May 1930 Konni, Pathanamthitta, Kerala
- Died: 17 January 1985 Meenangadi, Wayanad
- Education: M.A (Malayalam) Degree

Samuel Mar Philexinose (4 May 1930 – 17 January 1985) was the first bishop of the Malabar Diocese of the Malankara Jacobite Syrian Orthodox Church.

== Early life ==
1930 May 4: (Malayalam Era 1105 Medom 21) CG Samuel, who was to become Samuel Mar Philexinose, was born as the eldest son of Late Kodathu Charuvilayil Ghevarghese and Annammah, of Konni, who were members of the Malankara Jacobite Syrian Orthodox Church, Konni-Vakayar (Thumpamon Diocese). The family traces its origin to the Keekulathu Kizhakkekkara (Vadakkecharuvil Sakha) branch of the ancient family of Mundakkal Illom Tharavad located at Nariyapuram, Omallur, Pathanamthitta District.

1935-1942: He completed his studies at the Primary and Middle School levels (1st to 7th standard) at Kallara Krishnan Nair (KKN) Memorial English Medium School, Konni.

In 1941 CG Samuel, and his younger brother, KG George became disciples of Michael Mar Dionysius at a very young age. They together learnt the liturgy of the Jacobite Syrian Orthodox Church by heart, and served as altar-boys since they were 11 years old.

CG Samuel was ordained as a priest in 1959, and as Samuel Mar Philexinose, Metropolitan of Malabar Diocese in 1975.

1942-45: CG Samuel completed his high school education (Form 1 to Form 3) at Republican School, Konni.

1945-47: He attained high school education (Form 4 & Form 5) at KKN Memorial English Medium School, Konni.

1950-52: He completed intermediate college education at NSS College, Pandalam. In 1950 the Malabar Diocese was founded. The St. Peter's and St; Pauls Jacobite Syrian Orthodox Church, Meenangadi, were established in 1949.

1953-56: He enrolled for the BA (Malayalam) Degree Course at Union Christian College, Aluva.

1955: On 5 February 1955, CG Samuel was ordained as a deacon (Koruyo) at Chingavanam Mar Aprem Seminary by Abraham Mar Clemis of Knananya Arch Diocese, with recommendations from Michael Mor Dionysius.

1956-59: Dn. CG Samuel, underwent studies in theology and religious practices at St. Ignatius Dayro at Manjinikkara, and at Trikkunnath Seminary.

1959 February 14: Dn. CG Samuel was ordained as a priest (Kassisso) at Trikkunnath Seminary by Ghevarghese Mar Gregorios (Vayaliparambil Thirumeni) of Ankamali, on instructions from Michael Mar Dionysius.

1959-61: Fr. CG Samuel was enrolled for the MA (Malayalam) Degree Course at St. Berchmann's College, Changanassery.

On 25 December 1975, he was ordained as Ramban at the Mar Elia Jacobite Syrian Chapel at Puthencruz.

On 26 December 1975 he was ordained as metropolitan at the St. Mary's Jacobite Syrian Orthodox Simhasana Church or the Mar Sabore Afroth Simhasana Church, Thuruthissery, by the Catholicose of the East, Baselios Paulose II. Samuel Mar Philexinose was the first metropolitan to be ordained by the Catholicose.

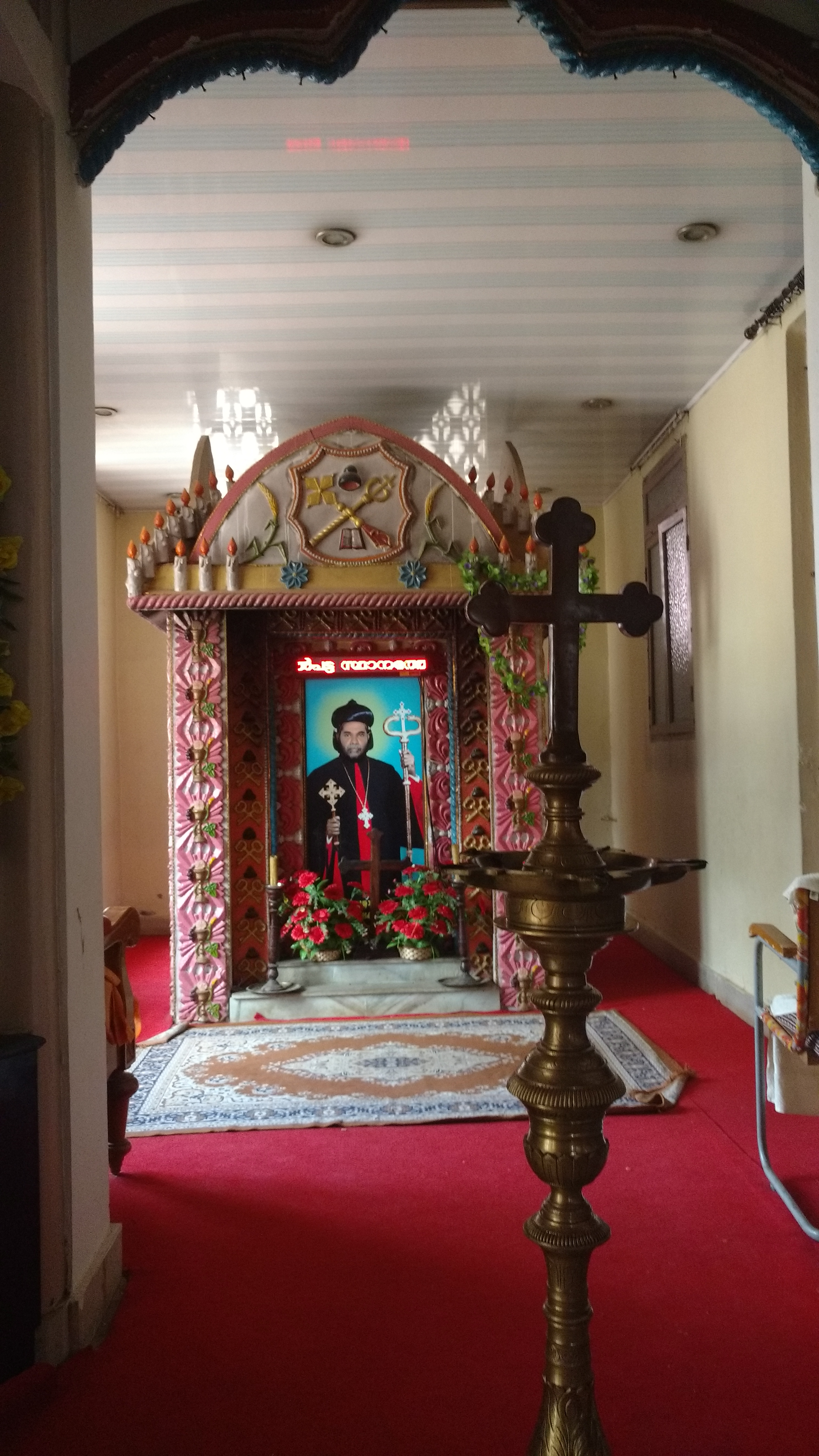
Tomb of Samuel Mor Philaxinos at Meenangadi

== In office ==
On 6 January 1976, The Order of Proclamation as the Metropolitan of Malabar, and Bahya Kerala Diocese, was handed over to him on the day of the remembrance of the baptism of Jesus Christ (Danaha), at St. Peter's and St. Paul's Jacobite Syrian Church, Meenangadi. There were 43 churches in the region of Malabar. The Meenangadi Church was established in 1949. From 1974 to 1975 Baselios Thomas I, Catholiose of the East) was in charge of the Malabar Diocese.

Samuel Mar Philexinose organized a visit by Ignatius Zakka Iwas I (Patriarch of Antioch), to St. Peter's and St Paul's Jacobite Syrian Church, Meenangadi.

He formulated the Constitution for Malabar Diocese. The constitution was approved by the laity and endorsed by Ignatius Zakka Iwas I. From 1984 to 1985 the Thirumeni founded the Jacobite Syrian Vacation Bible Class JSVBS when he was the President of Malankara Jacobite Sunday School Association (MJSSA).

1985, 12 Jan: Thirumeni was admitted to Lissy Hospital, Ernakulam for minor surgery on a diabetic foot lesion, but died of a hemorrhage that led to cardiac arrest on 17 January. He was buried at St. Peter's and St. Paul's Jacobite Syrian Cathedral, Diocese Headquarters, Meenangadi, Wayanad District, Kerala.
