= Timotheos Thomas =

Metropolitan of Kottayam

His Eminence "Naheero" Mor Mor Timotheos Thomas Metropolitan of Kottayam Diocese, Secretary to the Holy Episcopal Synod
- Kottayam Diocesan Metropolitan & Secretary to the Holy Episcopal Synod
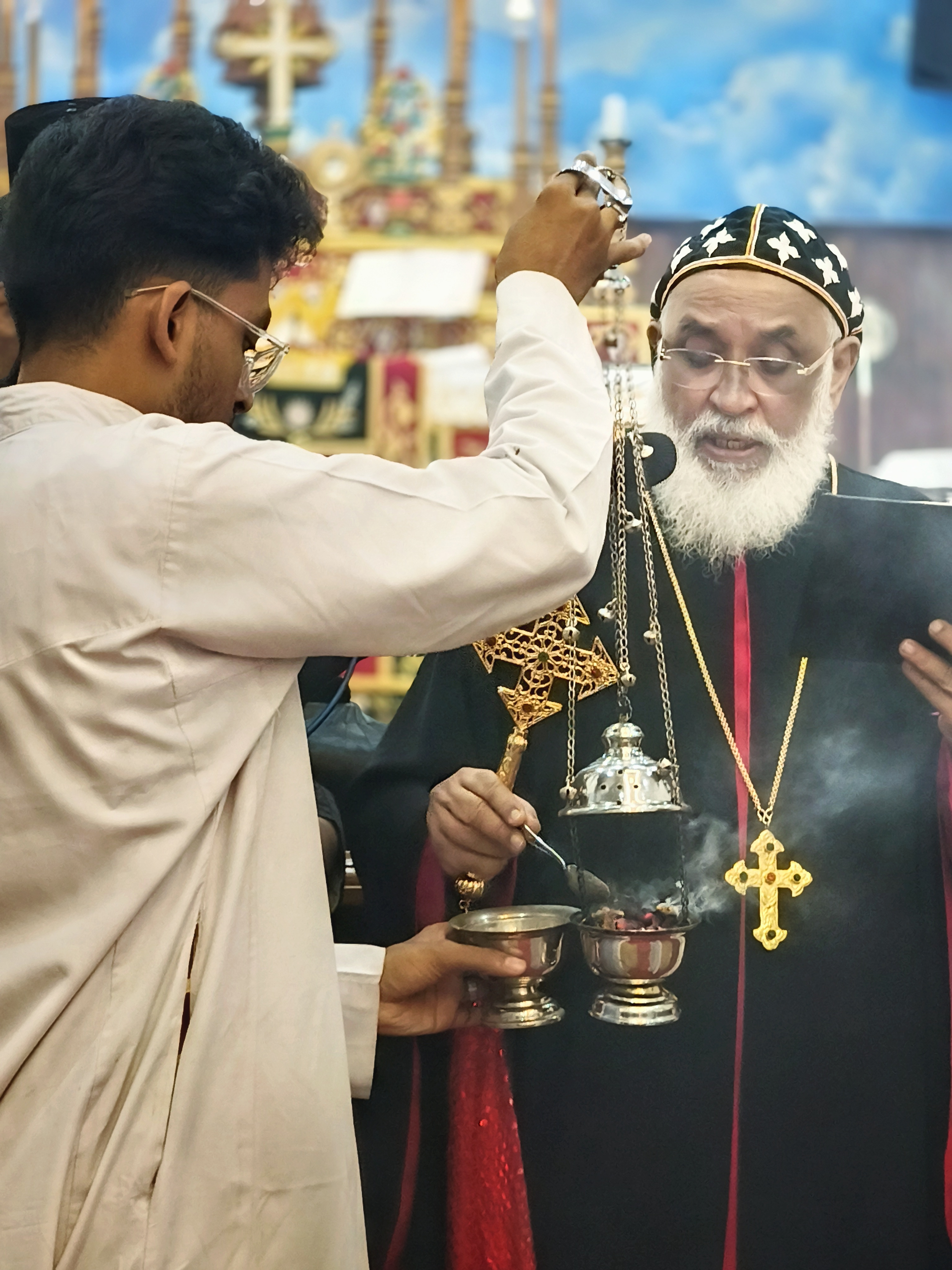
- Church: Jacobite Syrian Orthodox Church
- Diocese: Kottayam Diocese
- See: Holy Apostolic See of Antioch & All East
- Predecessor: Geevarghese Mor Gregorios, Kottayam Diocese & Thomas Mor Theophilose,(Outside Kerala Diocese)

Orders
- Ordination: 21 May 1975 (Kassisso) by Baselios Paulose II Catholicos
- Consecration: 3 January 1991 by Baselios Paulose II Catholicos
- Rank: Metropolitan

Personal details
- Born: 11 July 1949 (age 77) Areeparambu, Kottayam, Kerala
- Denomination: Malankara Syrian Orthodox Church
- Residence: St.Joseph's Cathedral Kottayam
- Parents: Mr. Kurian Kuruvilla and Mrs. Annamma Kuruvilla
- Education: B.D. and M.Th in Theology, United Theological College, Bangalore
- Alma mater: Erlangen-Nuremberg University

Mor Timotheos Thomas is the Metropolitan of Kottayam Diocese and Secretary to the Holy Episcopal Synod of the Jacobite Syrian Christian Church. Mor Themotheos Thomas was ordained as the Metropolitan of the Outside Kerala Diocese on 3 January 1991 by Mor Baselios Paulose II Catholicos of the East.

== Early life ==
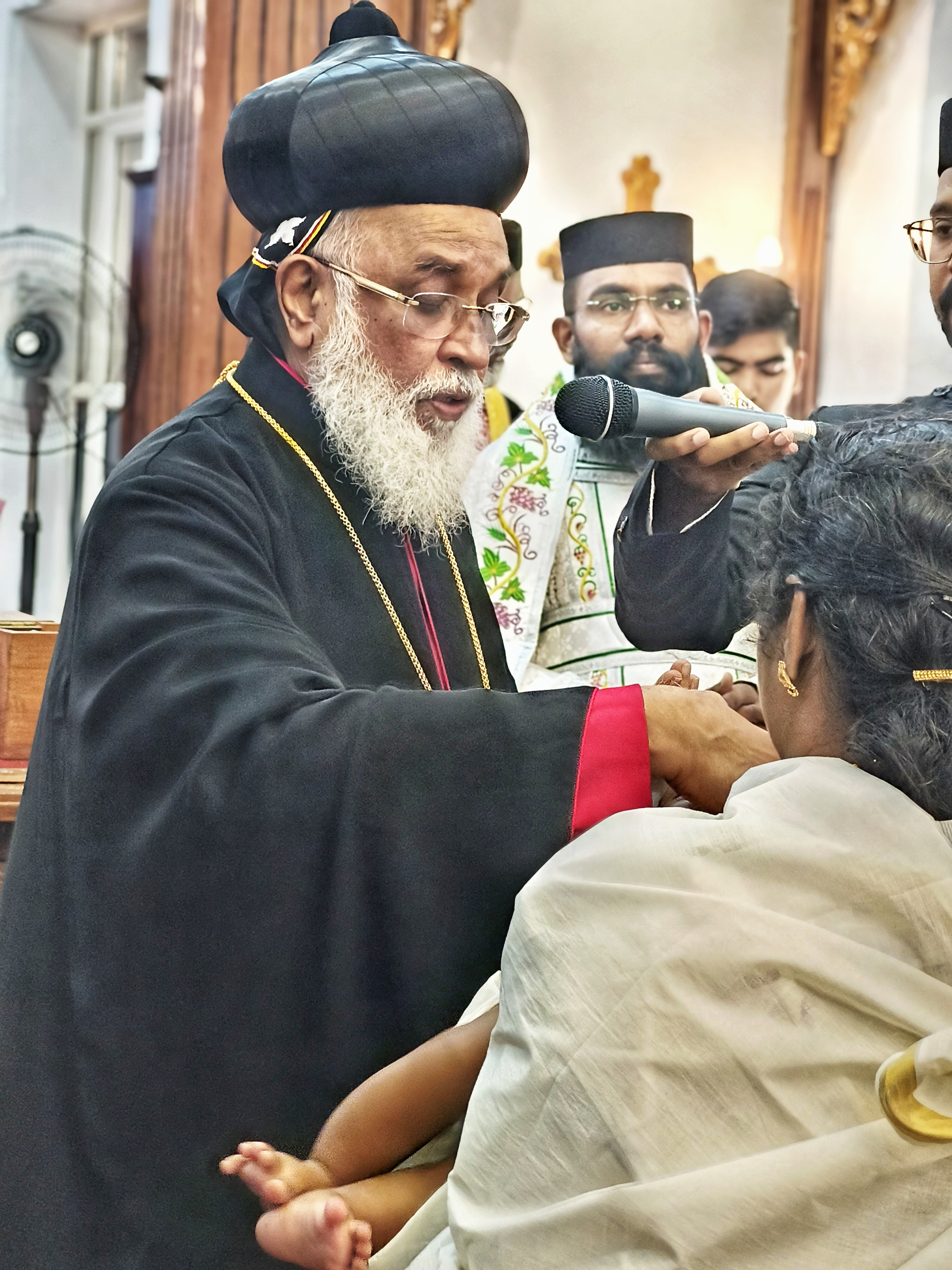
His Eminence at Baptism

Thomas was born on 11 July 1949 in the Muriyankal family of the Lakkattoor village (Kottayam District, Kerala, India) to Kurian Kuruvilla and Annamma Kuruvilla, the sixth of their eight children.

== Education ==
Thomas had his initial primary education in the village CMS (the Anglican Church Missionary Society) School. Middle School and High School education were completed at the Amayannoor High School. In 1964, while in the ninth grade, Thomas was ordained Korooyo by Mor Philoxenos Paulose (later Catholicose Baselios Paulose II) who was then Metropolitan of the Kottayam diocese. His parish priest, Corepiscopus Thomas Mattathil, imparted early instruction in Syriac and liturgical rites. Having completed the Secondary School Leaving Certificate (SSLC) examination in 1965, Thomas joined the Baselius College, Kottayam, for the Pre-Degree course. Subsequently, he joined the CMS college, Kottayam, where he continued till 1972, graduating with bachelor's and master's degrees in English literature.

== Theological education ==
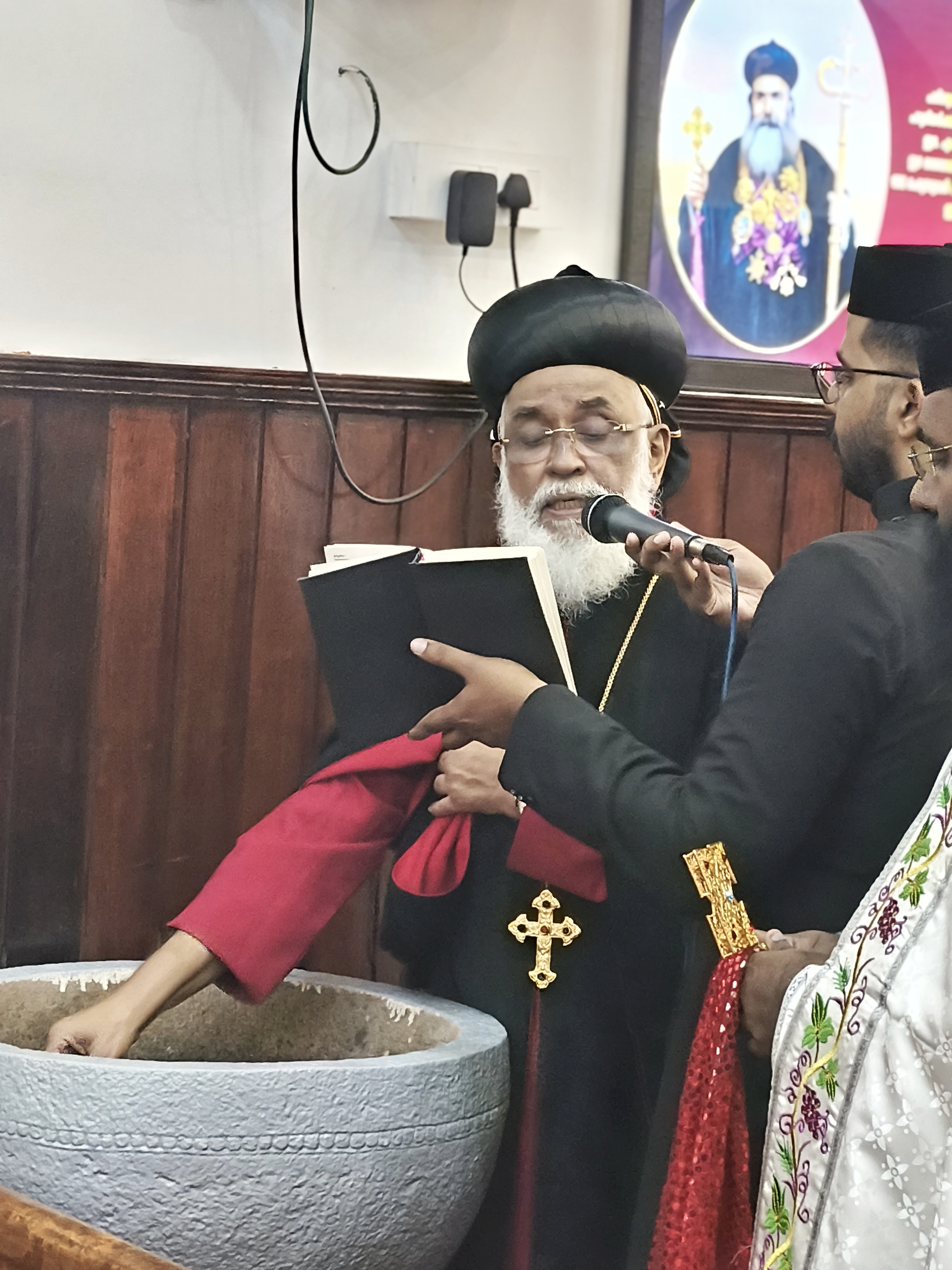
Holy Baptism ceremony held by Metropolitan H.E Thomas Mor Thimothios.

In 1973 Thomas joined the Old Seminary, Kottayam for theological studies. He could study there only for a year due to a volatile situation in the Malankara Church, which had its echoes on the Seminary too. Finding it difficult to continue, Thomas joined the Manjanikkara Dayro for Syriac Studies and priestly formation. Under the spiritual guidance of Jacob Madapattu Rabban (later Metropolitan Mor Yulius Ya`qub), he completed liturgical studies. During the one-year stay at the monastery, he completed a Bachelor of Education degree at the NSS Training College, Pandalam.

== Priesthood ==
While at the seminary, Metropolitan of Kottayam diocese Geevarghese Mor Gregorios (Perumpally Thirumeni) ordained him shamshono (full deacon). In 1975 Mor Philoxenos Paulose ordained him Kassisso (priest). Thereupon Thomas began to assist the vicar of his parish. Later he began to teach at the T.M. High School, Perumpilavu near Kunnamkulam. While teaching there, he assisted K.V. Kuriakose (later Mor Yulius Kuriakose), at the Simhasana Church, Kunnamkulam. When late Mor Philoxenos Paulose was consecrated Catholicose of the East, he invited Thomas to assist him at the Muvattupuzha Aramana. After a few months, Thomas was appointed vicar of the St. Mary's Church, Bangalore. This became a turning point in his life. He served in this capacity for eight years until 1984. During this period, along with his pastoral duties, Thomas completed the B.D. and M.Th. degrees from the United Theological College, Bangalore. St. Mary's Cathedral in Bangalore was built during this period.

== Bishopric ==
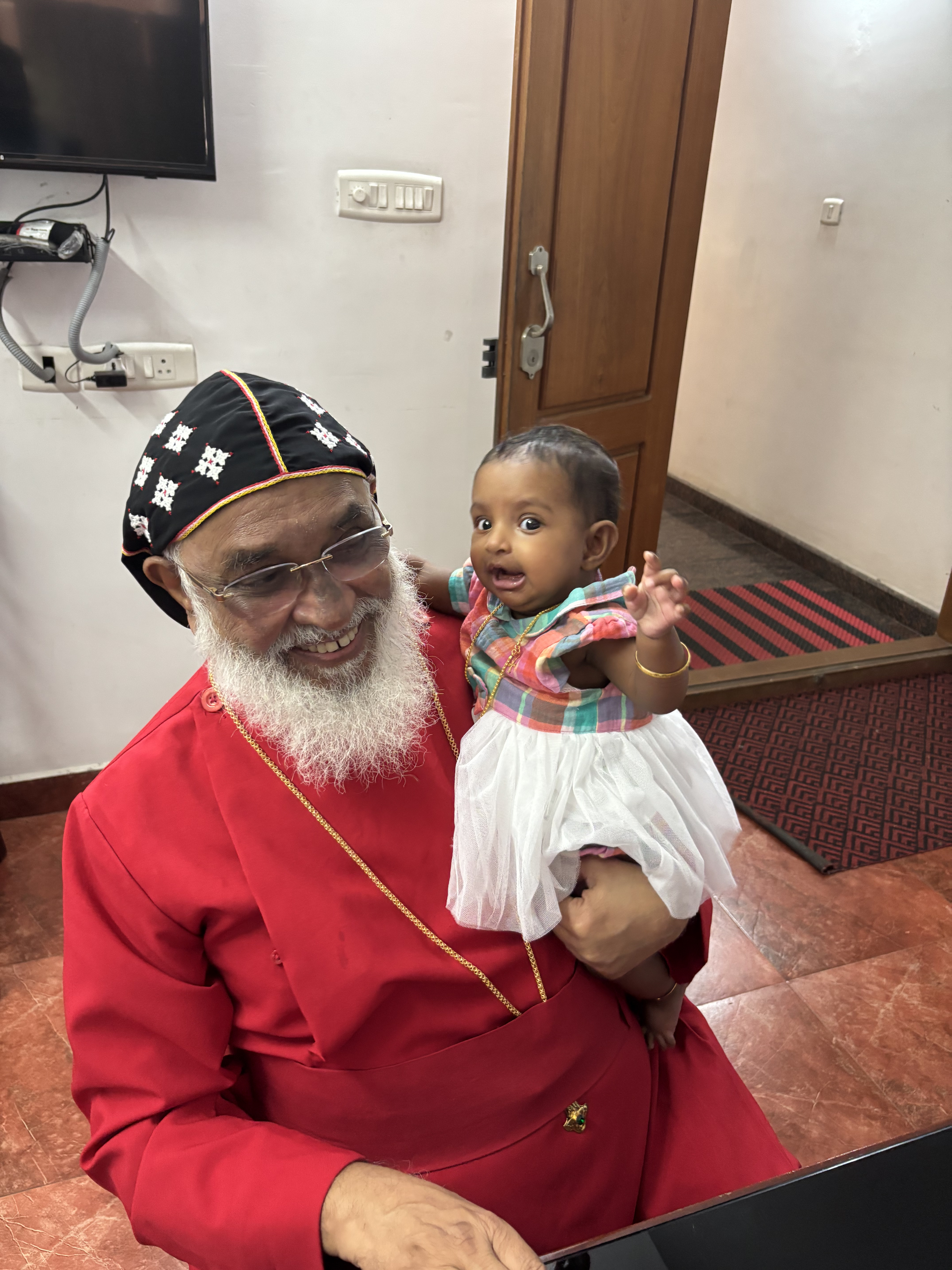
His Eminence Thomas Mor Thimothios Metropolitan with Baby Girl.

In 1984 Thomas became the vicar of St. Peter's Church, New Delhi, where he served for two years. In 1986 he left for Germany for higher studies and joined the Erlangen-Nuremberg University. After completing studies in the German language, he moved to the Goettingen University in 1987 to pursue Syriac patristic studies. He returned to India in 1990, after being elected to the bishopric of the Outside Kerala diocese. On 3 January 1991, Thomas was ordained Mor Timotheos Thomas to assist the Metropolitan of the Outside Kerala diocese Mor Theophilos Thomas, who was getting old. On 12 January 1992 Theophilos Thomas died, and Mor Timotheos assumed full responsibility for the diocese.

The Metropolitan established his administrative office at Mulund, Bombay. A new publication, "The Vision" was started thereafter and continues to be published as a bilingual monthly. Following the 1993 Latur earthquake, Thomas Mor Timotheos launched a rehabilitation program with the support of the entire Church. A Gram Jyothi Social Welfare Centre was established at the Harangul village in Latur which served three villages with health clinics and educational programs. A mission center was organized at Anagalpura near Bangalore city and the center started functioning along with St. George's School.

In 1999 when the late Metropolitan of Kottayam Diocese, Gregorios Geevarghese fell ill, Mor Timotheos Thomas assumed responsibility for the Kottayam diocese. After Gregorios Geevarghese died on 22 February 1999, full responsibility for the diocese was entrusted to Mor Timotheos. In addition, Thomas Mor Timotheos assumed responsibilities as Assistant Metropolitan for the Southern Kerala Dioceses of Thumpamon, Niranam, and Quilon for a short period. He served as the President of the Youth League of the Malankara Church.

== Ecumenical activities ==
Mor Timotheos Thomas participated in the Vienna Consultations—the dialogue between the Roman Catholic Church and the Oriental Orthodox Churches. He represented the Malankara Syrian Orthodox Church in the eighth assembly of the World Council of Churches, held at Zimbabwe in 1998. Thomas Mor Timotheos is a regular participant in forums hosted by the National Council of Churches in India (NCCI) and served for fours years as the President of NCCI Unit I. He was also a key participant in the dialogue between the Malankara Syrian Orthodox Church and the Catholic Church which produced breakthroughs in controversial issues such as inter-confessional marriages. As of 2013 Thomas Mor Timotheos was the president of the Bible Society of India, Kerala Auxiliary.

== Patriarchal honor ==
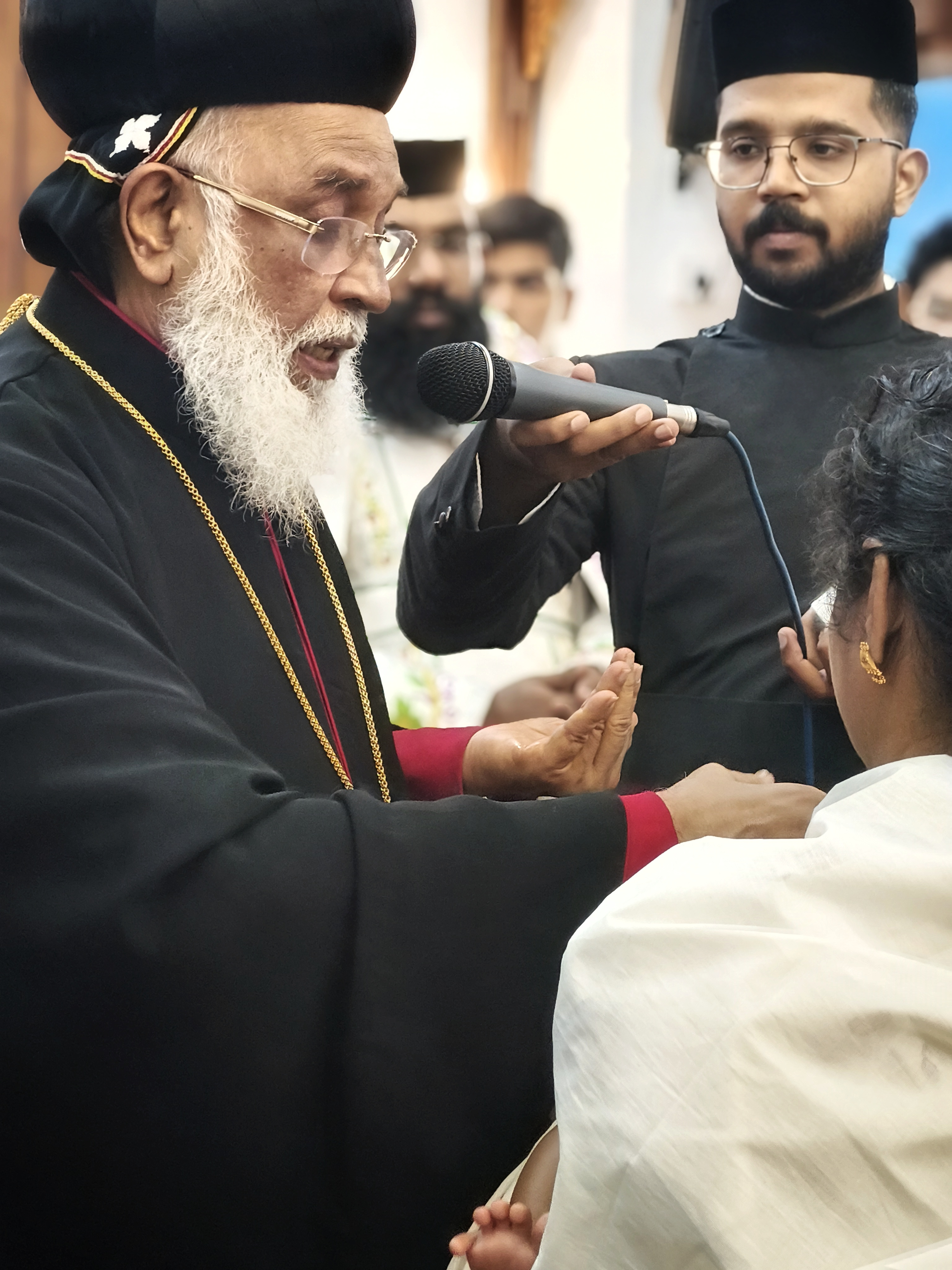
The Most Reverend Metropolitan H.E Thomas Mor Thimothios during the Sacrament of Baptism with the Holy Myron.

Moran Mor Ignatius Zakka Ist Iwas, the Patriarch of Antioch and Supreme Head of the Universal Syrian Orthodox Church honored Mor Thimotheos with the title "NAHEERO" which means "Brilliant" as a token of appreciation to his valuable services to the Syriac Orthodox Church In India.

== Episcopal contributions ==
Mor Themotheos Thomas has significant role in the development of the present Jacobite Syrian Orthodox Church in India, especially in the outside dioceses. The "Greater India Outside Arch diocese" under his jurisdiction is divided into 4 separate dioceses called Mumbai, Bangalore, Delhi and Mylapore (Chennai) which are administered by different metropolitans now. The efforts and labor of Mor Themotheos significantly helped the present growth of outside Kerala Jacobite dioceses into a worth position. Mor Themotheos ordained 6 present metropolitans of the church into the priesthood " Kassiso". No other bishop in the Jacobite church has that record as of now. Priests ordained by Mor Themotheos serving as Bishops are Mor Osthatheos Pathrose (Bangalore), Mor Eusebious Kuriakose (Delhi), Mor Coorilose Geevargese (Niranam), Mor Phelexinos Zacharias (Idukki), Mor Alexandrios Thomas (Mumbai), and Mor Thimotheos Matthew (Former Patriarchal Secretary).

Mor Themotheos is the founder of pre-marital counseling programs in Jacobite Syrian church. It was started it on his diocese, before being implemented to the whole church. Mor Themotheos served as the President and Resident Metropolitan of M.S.O.T seminary for 9 years ( 1991–2000).Later Dr. Mor Theophilose Kuriakose succeeded him. Mor Themotheos served as a Professor of MSOT Seminary as well. "Anagalapura Mission Centre, Hosur Mission Centre and Mysore Road Mision Centre" are under his leadership.

Mor Themotheos is elected as the "Secretary" to the Holy Episcopal Synod of the Jacobite Syrian Orthodox Church in India by the regional synod of Church held on 2018 December.

== See also ==
- Jacobite Syrian Christian Church
- Syriac Orthodox Church
