= Philoxenos Yuhanon =

Indian Syriac Orthodox bishop (1941-2015)

His Eminence 'Thanono' Dr. Mor Philoxenos Yuhanon
- Malankara Metropolitan
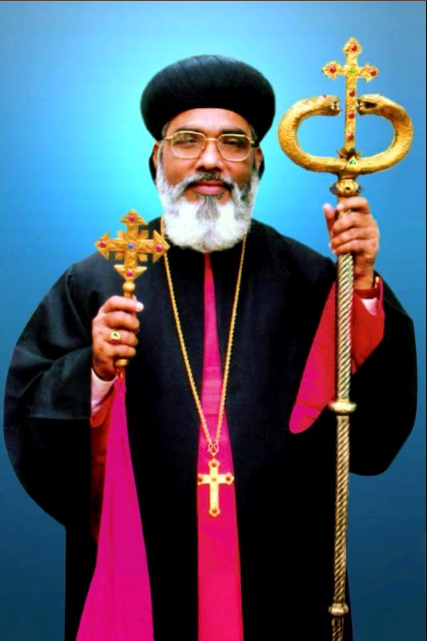
- Church: Syriac Orthodox Church (Malankara Jacobite Church)
- In office: 1999 - 2002
- Predecessor: Mor Geevarghese Gregorios
- Successor: Baselios Thomas I

Orders
- Ordination: 1969 (Kassisso) by Baselios Augen I Catholicos
- Consecration: 12 September 1985 by Baselios Paulose II Catholicos
- Rank: Valiya Metropolitan

Personal details
- Born: 5 December 1941 Pampady, Kerala, India
- Died: 30 December 2015 (aged 74) Kalpatta, Wayanad, Kerala, India
- Buried: St. Mary's Jacobite Syrian Simhasna Cathedral Pampady, Kottayam
- Denomination: Oriental Orthodox
- Education: B.A from Baselios College, Kottayam, M.A from Sri Venkateswara University, G.S.T. from Orthodox Theological Seminary, Kottayam, S.T.M from New York Theological Seminary, TH.D. from Logos Graduate School of Theology New York, D.D from Orlando International Seminary, Florida; C.P.E (Clinical Pastoral Education), New York Hindi Bhooshan ,Hindi Praveen for Hindi Language
- Alma mater: Sri Venkateswara University

Philoxenos Yuhanon
- Metropolitan of Malabar
- Diocese: Malabar Diocese
- In office: 1985 - 2010
- Predecessor: Samuel Mor Philaxinos
- Successor: Zacharias Mor Philoxenos

Mor Philoxenos Yuhanon (born John Jacob Elappanal; 5 December 1941 – 30 December 2015) was a Syriac Orthodox bishop who served as the 24th Malankara Metropolitan of the Malankara Syriac Orthodox Church from 1999 to 2002. He also served as the Bishop of Malabar Diocese of the Malankara Syriac Orthodox Church from 1985 to 2008.

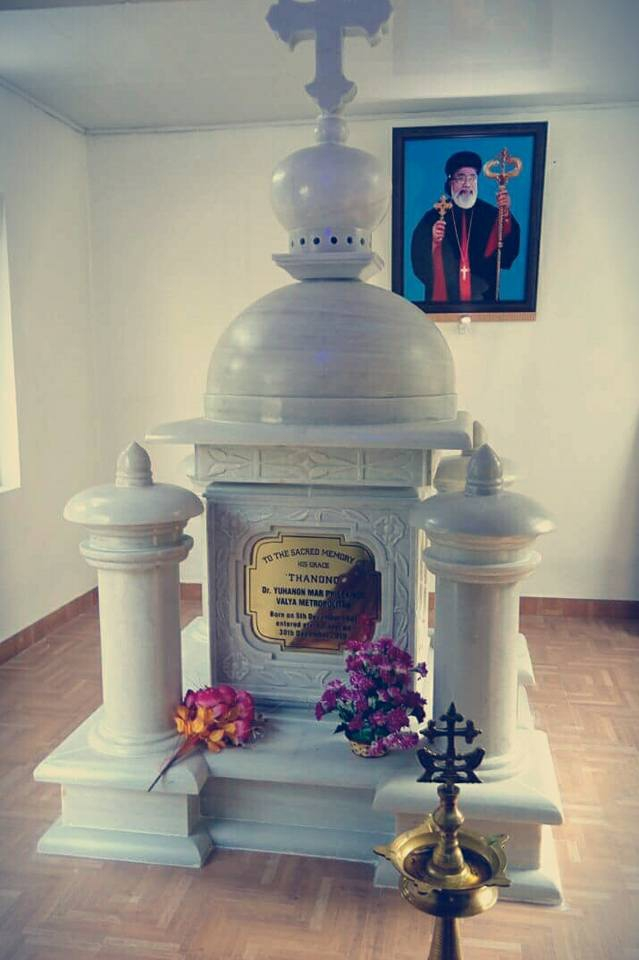
Tomb of Yuhanon Mor Philexinos

== Early years ==
John Jacob was born to the Elappanal Family of Pampady on 5 December 1941. In 1964, at the age of 23, he was ordained deacon by Mor Philaxinos Poulose (later Catholicos Mor Baselios Paulose II) during his rebellious Antiochian Movement, and Kassisho in 1969 by Mor Baselios Augen I.

== Education ==
Jacob had his primary and high school education at Pampady. Later, he joined Baselios College (Kottayam) where he received a BA in economics. After that he obtained an MA in economics from Sri Venkateswara University (Thirupathi). His basic theological training was at the Orthodox Theological Seminary in Kottayam. Mor Athanasius Yeshue Samuel, Archbishop of Canada, sponsored Jacob for his higher studies in the United States. Jacob joined the New York Theological Seminary and obtained his STM degree. Subsequently, he took his Th.D. degree from Logos Graduate School of Theology in New York City and DD degree from Orlando International Seminary in Florida. Mor Philoxenos is the only bishop in Malankara Jacobite Syrian Church with two doctorates. He also completed a Clinical Pastoral Education in New York. After becoming a bishop, Mor Philoxenos continued studying and joined Dakshina Bharat Hindi Prachar Sabha, a deemed university and center of excellence under Govt. of India, and secured Hindi Bhooshan and Hindi Praveen.

== As priest ==
When Jacob was studying in the USA, he served as the vicar in many Jacobite churches in Staten Island, Manhattan, Philadelphia, Chicago, Dallas, Houston and Augusta. He also performed volunteer work for the Jacobite Syrian Orthodox Church.

== As metropolitan ==
After 17 January 1985, when the Metropolitan of Malabar Diocese, Samuel Mor Philaxinos, died, the Holy Episcopal Synod selected Jacob as the new metropolitan to the diocese. On 12 September 1985 Mor Baselios Paulose II consecrated Jacob as the new metropolitan of Malabar, with the name Mor Philoxenos, at St Peter's & St Paul's Jacobite Syrian Orthodox Cathedral in Meenangadi.

The history of the Malabar Diocese is closely related to Yuhanon Mor Philexinos. When Yuhanon Mor Philoxenos took charge of Malabar, the Diocese area was in a high state of deterioration. He therefore co-ordinated the works in the diocese and constructed many new churches throughout the diocese. A lot of them are built in Nilgiri District of Tamil Nadu, Kozhikode and Malappuram Districts of Kerala.

Mor Philoxenos Yuhanon started institutions including:

- Mor Alias Snehabhavan
- Mor Philoxenos Memorial Press
- Mor Gregorios Teachers Training College
- St. Peter's & St. Paul's EHS School
- Aramana Chapel
- Mor Basil Day Care
- Mor Philoxenos Foundation
- The present Bishop's Palace

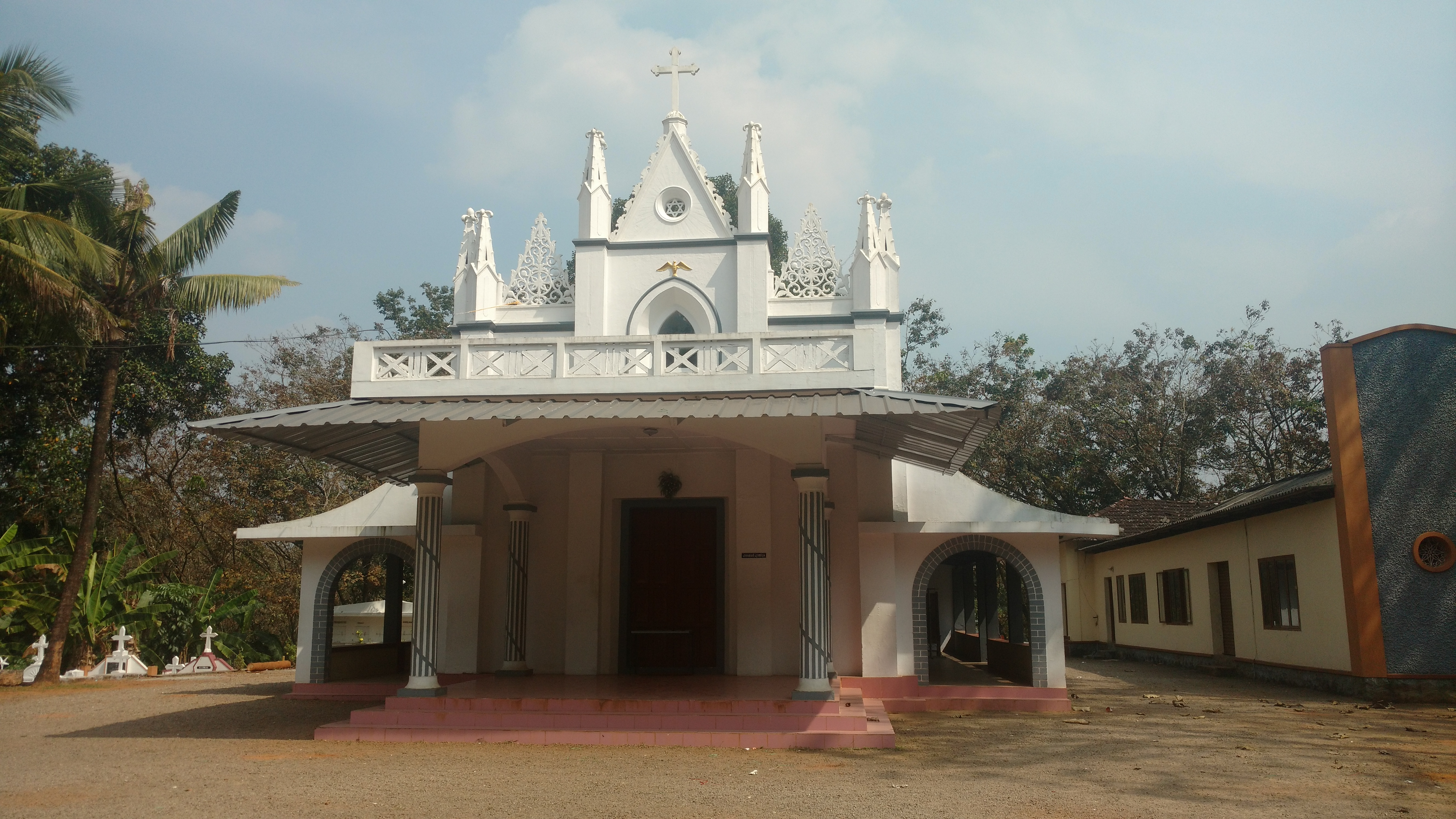
Resting Place and Parish of Yuhanon Mor Philexinos

== See also ==
- Syriac Orthodox Church
- Jacobite Syrian Christian Church

Malankara Syriac Orthodox Church Titles
Preceded by Geevarghese Gregorios; 1996-1999	Metropolitan Trustee of Jacobite Syrian Christian Church; 1999-2002	Succeeded by Baselios Thomas I 2002-2019
