= Clemis Kuriakose =

Indian Metropolitan

His Grace Mor Clemis Kuriakose Metropolitan of the Thrissur Diocese
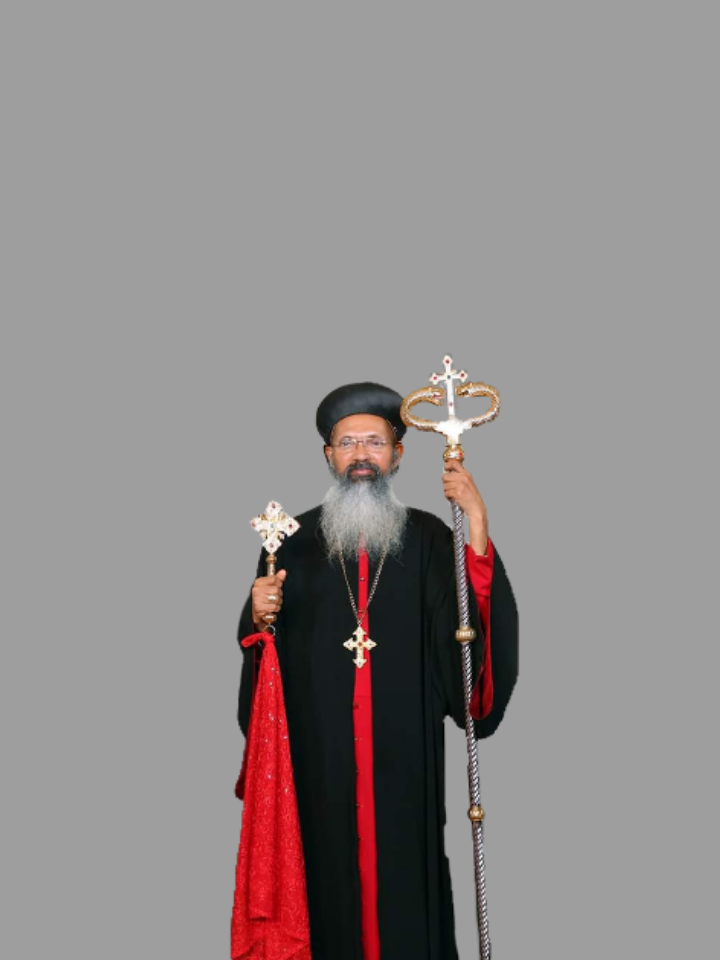
- Mor Clemis Kuriakose Metropolitan
- Native name: കുര്യാക്കോസ് മോർ ക്ലീമിസ്
- Church: Jacobite Syrian Orthodox Church
- Diocese: Thrissur Diocese
- See: Holy Apostolic See of Antioch & All East

Orders
- Consecration: by Moran Mor Ignatius Zakka I Patriarch
- Rank: Metropolitan

Mor Clemis Kuriakose is the Metropolitan of Thrissur Diocese of Malankara Jacobite Syriac Orthodox Church. On August 24, 2008, Moran Mor Ignatius Zakka Iwas I Patriarch consecrated Metropolitan. Kuriakose Mor Clemis was appointed as the Metropolitan of Idukki Diocese. Since May, 2020 he is the Metropolitan of Thrissur Diocese. Mor Clemis Kuriakose Metropolitan is also the former President of St. Paul's Mission of India. On December 26, 2019, Ignatius Aphrem II Patriarch appointed Bishop Clemis Kuriakose as Metropolitan of Thrissur Diocese based on the synod of Malankara Jacobite Syriac Orthodox Church.
