= Dionysius Geevarghese =

His Eminence 'Mshablono Thobo' Mor Dionysius Geevarghese Abbot of Piramadom Dayro
- Church: Jacobite Syrian Christian Church

Orders
- Ordination: 1974 (Kassisso) by Geevarghese Mor Gregorios
- Consecration: 8 December 2002 by Patriarch Ignatius Zakka I
- Rank: Metropolitan

Personal details
- Born: May 5, 1948 Kottayam
- Parents: Mr. Philipose and Mrs. Mariam
- Occupation: Syriac Scholar
- Education: Diploma in Theological Studies from Mor Ignatius Dayro Manjinikkara

Mor Dionysius Geevarghese (born 5 May 1948) is a Syriac Orthodox bishop, currently abbot of Piramadom Dayro.

== Older posts ==
As Metropolitan

1. Assistant metropolitan of Simhasana churches

He was the Vicar of the

1. Arthat St. Mary's Simhasana Church at Kunnamkulam
2. St. Ignatius Church at Erumely
3. St. Simon Church at Velloor
4. St. Mary's Church at Koruthodu
