= Philoxenos Zacharias =

His Grace Mor Philoxenos Zacharias
- Metropolitan of Idukki Diocese of Jacobite syrian church (Syriac Orthodox Church), Chief Co-ordinator and Director of the Mor Gregorian Retreat Centre
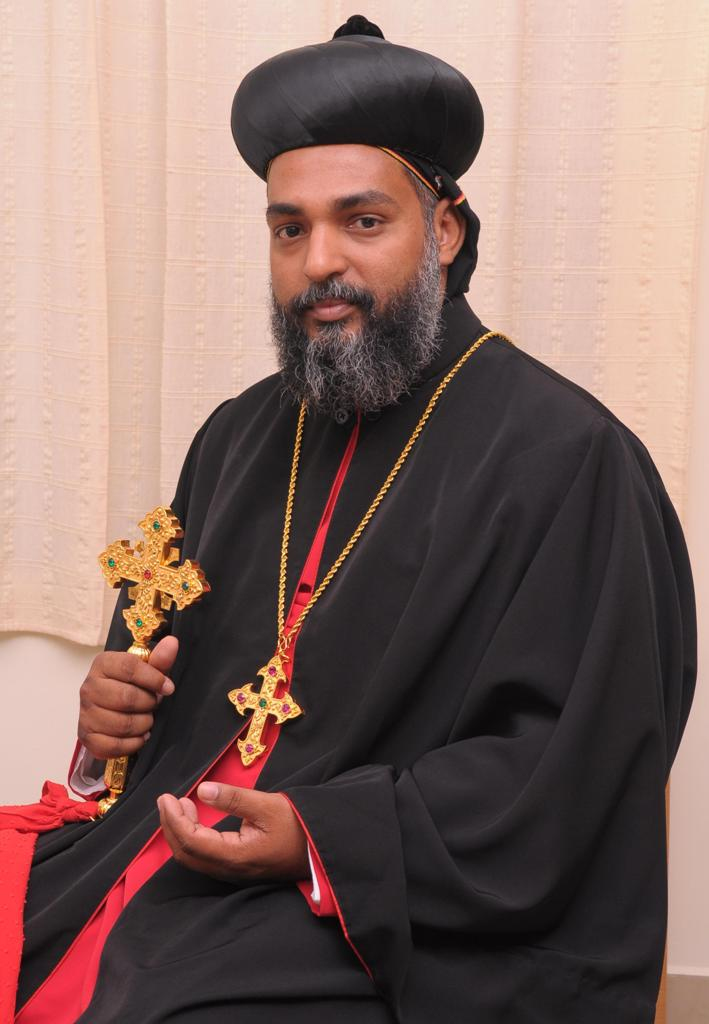
- Church: Jacobite Syrian Christian Church
- Diocese: Idukki Diocese
- See: Syriac Orthodox Patriarchate of Antioch and All the East
- In office: 2010 — present
- Predecessor: Yuhanon Mor Philexinos
- Successor: incumbent
- Previous post: None

Orders
- Ordination: 4 January 2010

Personal details
- Born: January 29, 1972 (age 54) Kumarakom, Kerala

Mor Philoxenos Zacharias, is a Metropolitan of the Malankara Syrian Jacobite Church.

== Early years ==
Therambil Achan was born in Kumarakom, Kottayam, Kerala in 1972. He was brought up in the Syriac Orthodox faith since his childhood. He passed his SSLC exams with first class and joined St. Mary's College Manarcad Kottayam for Pre Degree Course, as of 2013 Philoxinos was the chief Patron of Marian Alumni The Old Students Association of St. Mary's College Manarcad, Baselious College, Kottayam where he did his B.A. in English literature. Alongside his secular education, he also pursued his Sunday School education. He stood first in the 10th standard examinations.

== Family ==
His parents were Late Ittyavira & Sosamma Ittyavira. He has two brothers. Kuriakose TI&Kurian TI.

== Ordination ==
Mor Philoxenos was ordained a deacon in 1998 by Geevarghese Mor Gregorios (Perumpally Thirumeni) and a priest in 2000 by Thomas Mor Themotheose Metropolitan. After his ordination, he served various parishes in Kottayam Diocese. As well as he is the spiritual leader of all spiritual organisations of the Jacobite Church in Kottayam Diocese.

== Ministries run by Mor Philoxenos Zacharias ==
(Mor Gregorian centers in Thoothootty & Wayanad):

- Mor Gregorian Retreat Centre
- Mor Gregorian Counselling Centre
- Mor Gregorian Sharing Ministry (The Registered Charitable Society)
- Mor Gregorian Homes - The Centre for the elderly people
- Mor Gregorian Prayer Group
- Mor Gregorian Pain and Palliative Care Society
- Mor Gregorian Pain and Palliative Clinic
- Mor Gregorian free Ambulance Service

== See also ==
- Syriac Orthodox Church
- Jacobite Syrian Christian Church
