= St. Mary's Simhasana Church, Veliyanad =

Coordinates: 9.878217°N 76.487106°E

St. Mary's Simhasana Church, Vadayaparambu
- St. Mary's Simhasana Church, Vadayaparambu
- Location: Veliyanad (post), Arakkunnam, Ernakulam, Kerala
- Country: India
- Denomination: Malankara Jacobite Syriac Orthodox Church; Parish (Edavaka)
- Tradition: Malayalam
- Website: stmaryveliyanad.org

History
- Founded: 1975
- Dedication: St. Mary

Administration
- Diocese: Simhasana diocese

St. Mary's Simhasana Church (Vadayaparambu simhasana Palli), Vadayaparambu is one of Kerala's prominent Syriac Orthodox churches. The church was established in 1975 by Dr. Geevarghese Mor Gregorios (Perumpally Thirumeni). The church is headed by the "Patriarch of Antioch" and functions under the spiritual supremacy of the Syriac Orthodox Patriarchate of Antioch and all the East and the Regional church headquarters is at Puthencuriz, Kochi.

== History ==
Dispute over the power of the Mar Bahanan Syrian Orthodox Church, Vadayaparambu between the Indian Orthodox Church and Malankara Jacobite Syriac Orthodox Church lead to the establishment of this church and some fraction of the members came and created this one.

== Important festivals ==
Mathavinte Perunnal on 15 August is the main celebration in the church. The best attraction of the festival is the procession. The Festival of "St.George" on May 1 every year is another important festival of this church. Denaha (Annual celebration of the holy Baptism of Christ) on 6 January is the other main celebration in the church."Soonoro" of "Holy Virgin Mary","Thirusheshippu" of H.H Moran Mor Ignathious Elias III (Patriarch of Antioch and all the East (Omallur Bava) and "Bahanan Sahada was installed at this church".
