= Christophoros Markose =

Mor Christophoros Markose(Born Joshy C Abraham) is an Indian prelate, currently serving as Patriarchal Secretary for Malankara Affairs of the Syriac Orthodox Church. He was consecrated on September 14, 2022, by Patriarch Ignatius Aphrem II at St. Mary's Syriac Orthodox Cathedral. Atchaneh, Lebanon.
