= Grand Metropolitan of the East =

The Grand Metropolitan of the East may refer to:

- Patriarch of the Church of the East
- Maphrian (Catholicos of India)

== See also ==
- Catholicos
