= Catholicos of India =

Office in the Syriac Orthodox Church

Catholicos of India (Malankara) ܡܦܪܝܢܐ ܕܡܕܢܚܐ

Syriac Orthodox Church
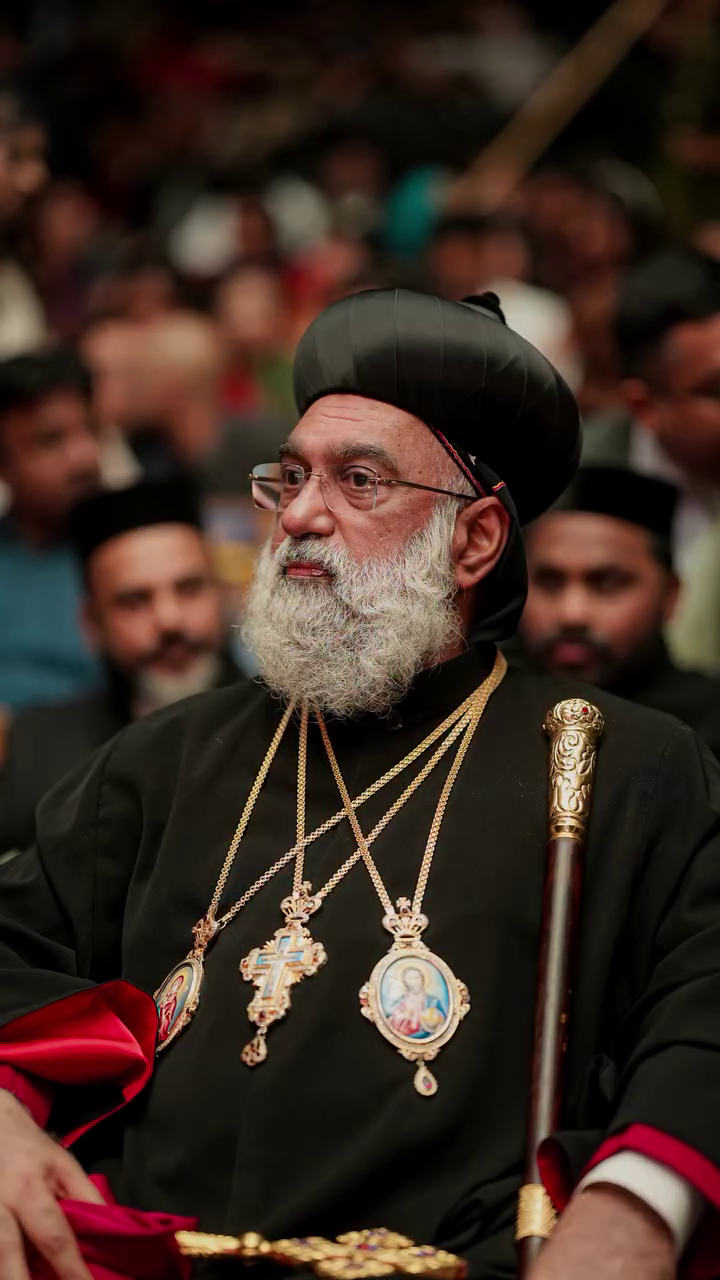

- Coat of arms
- Incumbent; Baselios Joseph (Since 25 March 2025)
- Style: Aboon Mor; His Beatitude

Location
- Country: India
- Territory: Catholicate See
- Residence: Patriarchal Centre, Puthencruz
- Headquarters: Patriarch Ignatius Zaka I Iwas Centre, Kerala, India

Information
- First holder: St. Marutha of Tagrit; Augen I (in India)
- Denomination: Oriental Orthodox
- Rite: Antiochian Rite
- Established: 1964
- Cathedral: Mar Athanasius Cathedral, Puthencruz
- Patron father: Saint Thomas the Apostle
- Parent church: Syriac Orthodox Church

Website
- www.jscnews.in

The Catholicos of India, also referred to as the Maphrian of the East is the head of the Jacobite Syrian Christian Church. He is ordained by the Syriac Orthodox patriarch of Antioch and functions within the Syriac Orthodox Church at an ecclesiastical-rank subordinate to him. He presides over the holy synod of the Jacobite Syrian Christian Church in India. The current Catholicos of India is Baselios Joseph, who was elevated on March 25, 2025.

The catholicate is considered the continuation of the historical Maphrianate of the East which was established in the 7th century, to oversee the affairs of the Syriac Orthodox Church in Persia under the jurisdiction of the Patriarchate of Antioch. It was abolished in 1860 by the holy synod of the Syriac Orthodox Church, and reestablished in Kerala in 1964 with the title "Catholicos" with jurisdiction over India. The Indian catholicos is seated at Mar Athanasius Cathedral, Puthencruz, Kerala.

== Catholicos/Maphrian ==
The word is a transliteration of the Greek καθολικός (pl. καθολικοί), meaning “concerning the whole, universal or general”, a title that existed in the Roman Empire when the government representative in-charge of a large area was called 'Catholicos'. The churches later started to use this term for their chief bishops.

'Maphriyono' (Maphrian) is derived from the Syriac word 'afri', meaning "to make fruitful", or "one who gives fecundity". This title may be used exclusively for the head of the Syriac Orthodox Church in the East. From the mid-13th century and onwards, a few occupants of the Maphrianate were referred-to also as 'Catholicos', but the title never came into extensive usage.

In the 20th century, when the office of the catholicate (maphrianate) under the Syriac Antiochian Church was re-established in India, the chief of the local church assumed the title 'Catholicos of the East', but his jurisdiction was restricted to India in the East. Later, in the 21st century (2002), the catholicate was renamed to Catholicate of India, and the catholicos assumed the title 'Catholicos of India' as per the constitution of the church in India, officially known as "Catholicos of the East" or "Maphrian of the East" in the Syriac Orthodox Constitution.

In the Syriac Orthodox context, both catholicos and maphrian have the same meaning, and refer to the same office. "Catholicos" is commonly used to refer to the office in Malayalam and English, while "Maphrian" is used to refer to the office in Syriac and other semitic languages.

== History of the Maphrianate ==
When the office of the Catholicos of Selucia fell into the Nestorian heresy, St. Jacob Baradeus consecrated St. Ahudemmeh of Balad as "‘the Grand Metropolitan of the East" in AD 559 to oversee the Miaphysite Orthodox community in Persia and outside the Roman/Byzantine Empire of which Malankara was a part of, functioning under the jurisdiction of the Syriac Orthodox patriarchate of Antioch and All the East, later becoming known as the "Maphrian of the East" by the 8th century. The maphrianate was established in Tagrit, until the destruction of its cathedral in 1089. It then moved to Mosul, before it was abolished in 1860 by the Holy Synod of the Syriac Orthodox Church, presided by Patriarch Ignatius Jacob II.

Early maphrians who are buried in Malankara include St. Baselios Yeldho, who is buried at Marthoma Cheriapally in Kothamangalam, Kerala, and St. Baselios Shakrallah, who is buried at Martha Mariam Church in Kandanad, Kerala.

== Reestablishment of the Catholicate in India ==
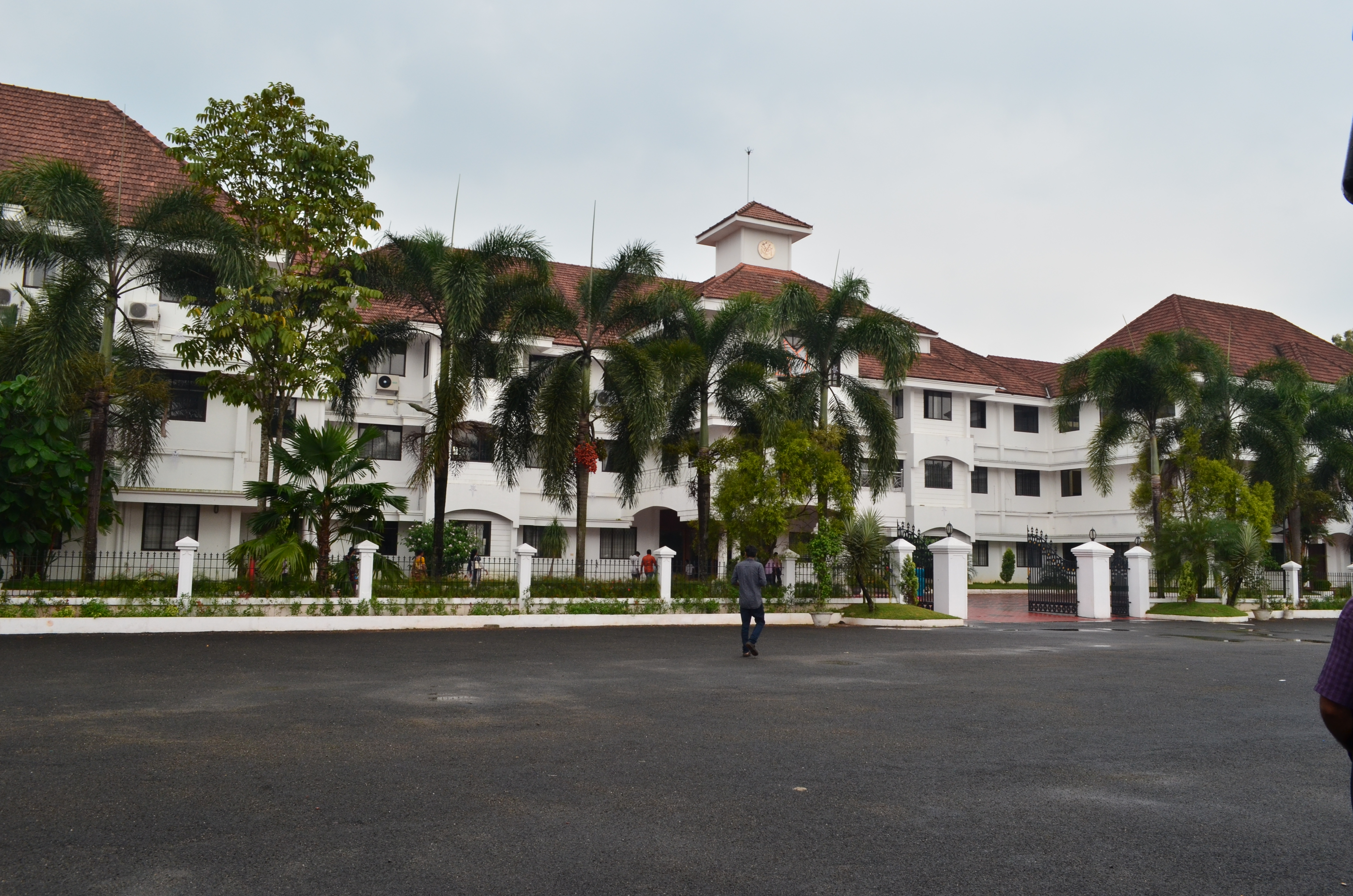
Patriarchal Centre in Puthencruz, Kerala, the headquarters of the Catholicate of India.

The origin of the Catholicate in India is filled with controversy. In 1912, the Malankara Metropolitan, Dionysius Vattesseril, was excommunicated by Ignatius Abded Aloho II. He went to the Patriarch Ignatius Abded Mshih II, who had been deposed by the Ottoman government and had him establish an autocephalous catholicate. This formed the Malankara Orthodox Syrian Church.

In 1955, following reconciliation talks with this faction, the Syriac Orthodox synod decided to canonically re-establish the Maphrianate of the East with enthronement of Augen I as catholicos/maphrian of the reunified church by the Episcopal Synod presided over by Patriarch Ignatius Jacob III in 1964. The church later split again in 1975, when the catholicos claimed the Maphrianate had hierarchical equivalence to the patriarchate, and that the patriarch had no authority in Malankara. This caused the Syriac Orthodox Synod of 1975 to excommunicate Augen I which caused the Malankara Orthodox Syrian Church to split from the Syriac Orthodox Church of Antioch.

After the deposition of his predecessor, Baselios Paulose II was enthroned the Second Catholicose/Maphrian of Jacobite Syrian Christian Church, by Ignatius Jacob III. After Baselios Paulose II's demise in 1996 the office remained vacant for several years to accommodate reconciliation attempts, which were unsuccessful.

In 2002, the Catholicos Baselios Thomas I was enthroned by Patriarch Ignatius Zakka I Iwas to be the head of the Jacobite Syrian Christian Church which is under the auspicious of Syriac Orthodox Church of Antioch. Since then the catholicos have adopted the title of Catholicos of India, due to its jurisdiction was over India (Malankara).

== Authority ==
As the head of the maphrianate of the Syriac Orthodox Church, the Catholicos of India presides over the holy episcopal synod of Jacobite Syrian Christian Church and is the second highest ranking bishop in Syrian Orthodox Church after the patriarch. He is allowed to consecrate bishops within his jurisdiction and consecrate holy myron with the consent of the patriarch. His name is to be remembered after the patriarch and by all the churches under the Catholicate see and the Malankara diaspora, as well as any church he attends. The jurisdiction of the Syriac Orthodox catholicos and maphrian is in India, although he is often invited to preside over Syriac Orthodox functions elsewhere.

The authority of the catholicos is defined in the constitution of the Syriac Orthodox Church of 1998.

== Catholicate see ==
- Jacobite Syrian Christian Association
- EAE Archdiocese
- Simhasana Churches
- Malankara Syriac Knanaya Archdiocese
- Malankara Archdiocese of North America
- Malankara Archdiocese of Australia
- Patriarchal Vicarates outside India
  - Kuwait
  - Qatar
  - Bahrain
  - UAE
  - Oman
  - Saudi Arabia
  - Yemen
  - New Zealand
  - Germany
  - United Kingdom
  - Canada
  - Singapore
  - Malaysia

== List of catholici of India ==
- 1. Augen I (1964–1975)
  - Baselios Augen I was enthroned as the Maphrian of the Syriac Orthodox Church by Ignatius Jacob III, Patriarch of Antioch at M.D. Seminary Chapel, Kottayam, India. He was later deposed in 1975 by Ignatius Jacob III.
- 2. Paulose II (1975–1996)
  - Baselios Paulose II was enthroned as the Maphrian of the Syriac Orthodox Church by Ignatius Jacob III, Patriarch of Antioch at the Patriarchal Cathedral of Saint George, Damascus, Syria.
- vacant (1996–2002)
- 3. Thomas I (2002–2024)
  - Baselios Thomas I was enthroned as the Maphrian of the Syriac Orthodox Church by Ignatius Zakka I, Patriarch of Antioch at Mor Ephrem Monastery, Ma`arat Sayyidnaya, Syria.
- 4. Joseph (2024–Present)
  - Baselios Joseph I was enthroned as the Maphrian of the Syriac Orthodox Church by Ignatius Aphrem II, Patriarch of Antioch at St. Mary's Patriarchal Cathedral, Atchaneh, Lebanon.

== See also ==
- Oriental Orthodoxy
- Patriarch of Antioch
- List of Maphrians
- Maphrian
- Syriac Orthodox Church of Antioch
- Jacobite Syrian Church
- List of Syriac Orthodox patriarchs of Antioch

== Sources ==
- Constitution (1998). Syriac Orthodox Church Constitution. "His Beatitude The Catholicos ranks second after the Patriarch within the Syrian Orthodox Church hierarchy. He is elected only by the Metropolitans under the jurisdiction of the Catholicate See. They must obey him, so must the priests, deacons and all the people within the Syrian Orthodox Archdioceses in India. At his ordination, he is proclaimed: Mor Baselius... (his personal name is added here). His name shall be proclaimed throughout the archdioceses in India during the Holy Mass and canonical prayers, after the name of the Patriarch and preceding the name of the Archdiocese Metropolitan. His name should be mentioned also at every Syrian church where he attends prayer. His title is: His Beatitude Mor Baselius... Catholicos of the East and Metropolitan of Malankara."
