= Meenangadi =

- Town

- Location within Kerala Location within India
- Coordinates: 11.660779°N 76.155185°E
- Country: India
- State: Kerala
- District: Wayanad
- Block: Sulthan Bathery
- First Settlement: Neolithic Age
- Named for: Matsya Avathara Temple and Fish Market

Area
  - Total: 53.52 km^{2} (20.66 sq mi)
- Elevation: 773.00 m (2,536.09 ft)

Population (2011)
  - Total: 33,450
  - Estimate (2016): 34,601
  - Density: 625.0/km^{2} (1,619/sq mi)

Languages
  - Official: Malayalam; Others:English, Kannada, Tamil, Hindi
  - Summer (DST): UTC+5:30 (IST)
- PIN: 673 591
- Telephone code: 91 (0)4936

Meenangadi is an old town situated on the highway NH 766 between Kalpetta and Sulthan Bathery in Wayanad District, in Kerala, India. This place is one among the Provinces where the existence of Dolmens provide historical evidence of earlier civilisation. Coffee bean, Black pepper, Ginger, Rice and Areca are the major crops cultivated in this area. Meenangadi is famous for its Fish Market and Cattle Market. The nearest railway station is at Kozhikode at 87 km and airport is Kannur International Airport with 94 km from Meenangadi. Meenangadi is surrounded by, Ambalavayal Panchayat, Kalpetta Taluk towards west, Gudalur Taluk towards East, Mananthavady Taluk towards west. Kalpetta, Sultan Bathery, Kozhikode are the nearby Cities and towns to Meenangadi.
Kerala's first carbon neutrality project launched in Meenangadi in June 2016. Upon achieving the goals of the project, Meenangadi will be the first village in India to go completely carbon neutral. Meenangadi has a population of 33450 According to 2011 Census with two Villages Purakkadi and (Part)Krishnagiri.

The village is home to St. Peter Orthodox Valiyapally, a major parish affiliated with the Malankara Orthodox Syrian Church.

== Educational institutions ==
- Government Higher Secondary School Meenangadi
- Govt Lower Primary School Meenangadi
- Govt Polytechnic College Meenangadi
- Ann's English Medium School Meenangadi
- St Peter's and St Paul's English High School Meenangadi
- Eldho Mor Baselios College Meenangadi
- St Gregorios Teachers Training College Meenangadi
- IHRD College Meenangadi

== Climate ==
Climate data for Meenangadi, Kerala
| Month | Jan | Feb | Mar | Apr | May | Jun | Jul | Aug | Sep | Oct | Nov | Dec | Year |
|---|---|---|---|---|---|---|---|---|---|---|---|---|---|
| Mean daily maximum °C (°F) | 27.2 (81.0) | 29 (84) | 30.7 (87.3) | 30.6 (87.1) | 29.6 (85.3) | 26.1 (79.0) | 24.7 (76.5) | 25.3 (77.5) | 26.2 (79.2) | 26.8 (80.2) | 26.5 (79.7) | 26.5 (79.7) | 27.4 (81.4) |
| Mean daily minimum °C (°F) | 16.6 (61.9) | 17.8 (64.0) | 19.5 (67.1) | 20.7 (69.3) | 20.8 (69.4) | 19.8 (67.6) | 19.4 (66.9) | 19.4 (66.9) | 19.2 (66.6) | 19.4 (66.9) | 18.5 (65.3) | 16.9 (62.4) | 19.0 (66.2) |
| Average precipitation mm (inches) | 4 (0.2) | 9 (0.4) | 17 (0.7) | 95 (3.7) | 185 (7.3) | 513 (20.2) | 1,011 (39.8) | 543 (21.4) | 235 (9.3) | 226 (8.9) | 84 (3.3) | 22 (0.9) | 2,944 (116.1) |
Source: Climate-Data.org
