= Ignatius Aphrem II =

123rd Patriarch of the Syriac Orthodox Church of Antioch (2014–Present)

His Holiness Moran Mor Ignatius Aphrem II ܡܪܝ ܐܝܓܢܛܝܘܣ ܐܦܪܝܡ ܬܪܝܢܐ إغناطيوس أفرام الثاني Patriarch of Antioch and all of the East
- 123rd Patriarch of the Universal Syriac Orthodox Church
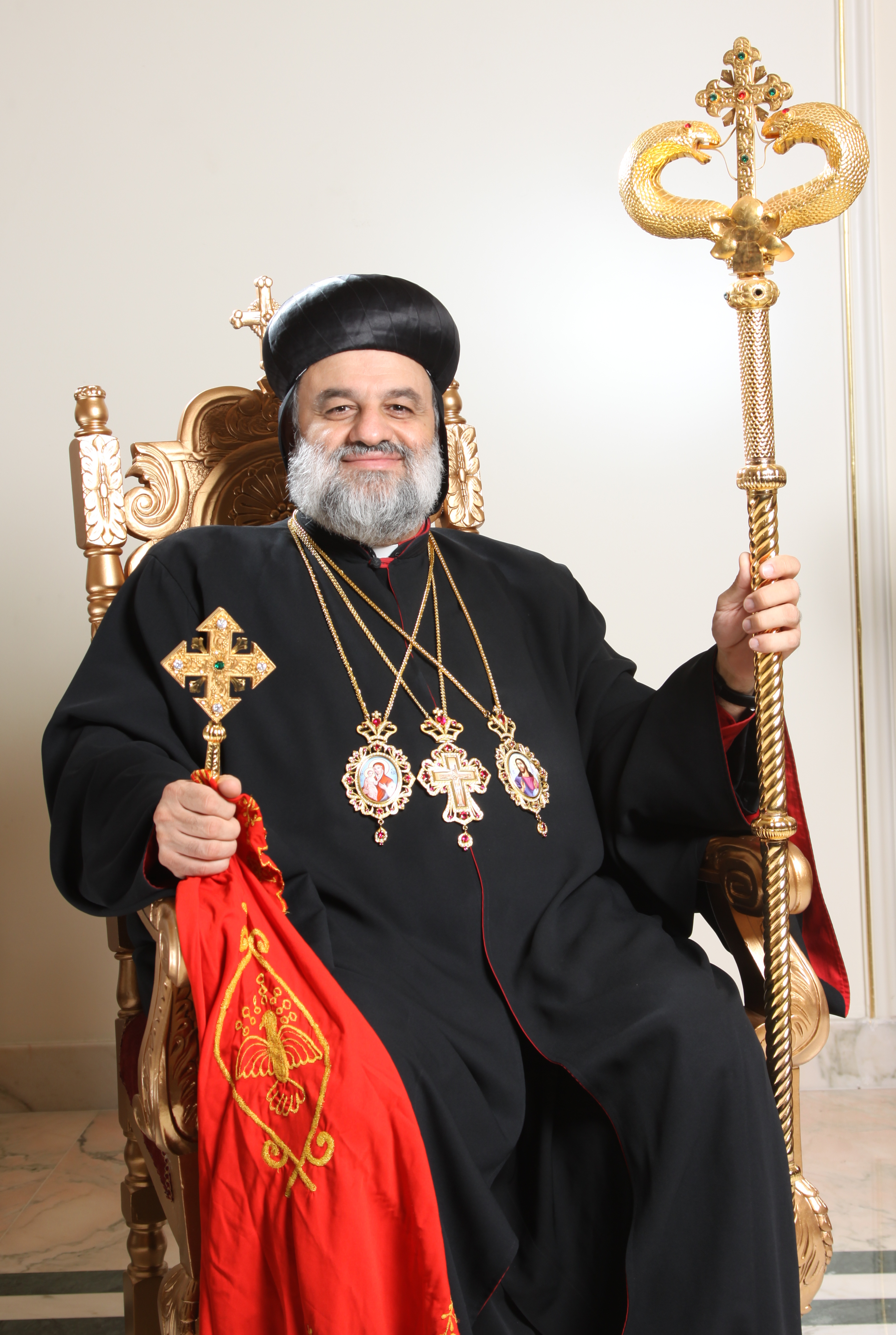
- Ignatius Aphrem II in 2014
- Native name: Syriac: ܐܝܓܢܛܝܘܣ ܐܦܪܝܡ ܬܪܝܢܐ; Arabic: إغناطيوس أفرام الثاني
- Church: Syriac Orthodox Church
- Diocese: Antioch
- See: Holy See of Antioch
- Elected: 31 March 2014
- Installed: 29 May 2014
- Predecessor: Moran Mor Ignatius Zakka I Iwas
- Previous posts: Metropolitan and Patriarchal Vicar of the Archdiocese of the Eastern United States

Orders
- Ordination: 1985
- Consecration: 28 January 1996
- Rank: Patriarch

Personal details
- Born: Saʿid Karim (Syriac: ܣܥܝܕ ܟܪܝܡ; Arabic: سعيد كريم); May 3, 1965 (age 61)
- Denomination: Syriac Orthodox
- Parents: Issa and Khanema Karim
- Education: Coptic Theological Seminary (BA); St Patrick's College, Maynooth (STL, DD)

Mor Ignatius Aphrem II (Note: Syriac: ܡܪܢ ܡܪܝ ܐܝܓܢܛܝܘܣ ܐܦܪܝܡ ܬܪܝܢܐ, romanized: Moran Mor Ignaṭius Afrem Trayono; Arabic: إغناطيوس أفرام الثاني, romanized: Iġnāṭīūs Afrām al-Ṯānī) (born 3 May 1965 as Sa'id Karim; Arabic: سعيد كريم, romanized: Saʿīd Karīm) is a Syrian–American Christian prelate who has served as the Patriarch of the Syriac Orthodox Church since 29 May 2014.

Born and raised in Qamishili, Syria, Karim became a monk in 1985 and was later ordained as a deacon and then as a priest. He received a Bachelor of Arts in Divinity from the Coptic Theological Seminary in Cairo in 1988. In 1992, he received a Licentiate of Sacred Theology and in 1994, a Doctor of Divinity from St Patrick's College, Ireland. In 1996, Aphrem Karim was consecrated as the patriarchal vicar and metropolitan archbishop of the Archdiocese for the Eastern United States by Patriarch Ignatius Zakka I Iwas. As an archbishop, he established 11 new parishes, bringing the number of parishes in the archdiocese to 20. He also created Syriac Orthodox Archdiocesan Youth Organization, an initiative to coordinate youth activities across parishes in the archdiocese.

Upon his accession to the throne as patriarch, Aphrem II took the patriarchal name Ignatius, becoming the second patriarch to bear the monastic name Aphrem after Patriarch Ignatius Aphrem Barsoum. Unlike his immediate predecessors, Aphrem II chose not to use Karim, his family name, in his official title. As a patriarch, he had made several apostolic visits to churches in the Middle East and also to churches in several countries. Aphrem II has been particularly vocal about his support for Syria and its people.

== Early life and education ==
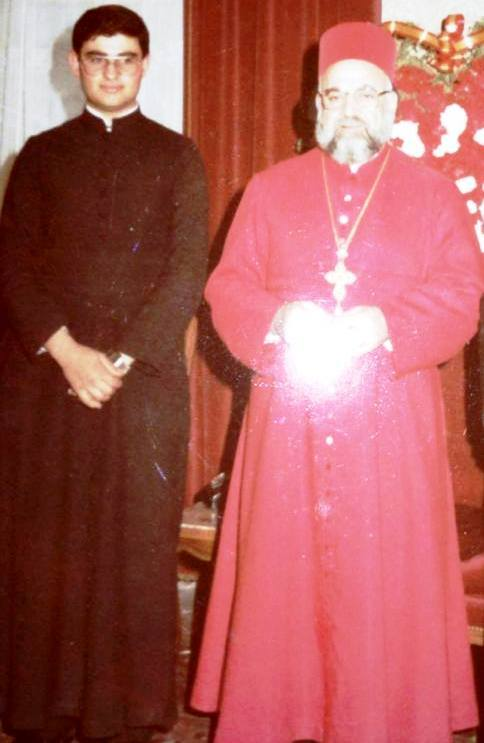
The young Deacon Aphrem Karim (later Patriarch Ignatius Aphrem II) with his predecessor Patriarch Ignatius Zakka I Iwas in 1985

Saʿid Karim was born on May 3, 1965, in Qamishli, located in northeastern Syria. He was the youngest son of Issa and Khanema Karim. His family belonged to the Syriac Orthodox Christian Assyrian community who originally hailed from the village Ëḥwo (Turkish: Güzelsu) in the Tur Abdin region of Mardin Province, Turkey. Karim's father died early in his life, so he was primarily raised by his mother.

Karim completed his primary education in Qamishli in 1977. He then pursued religious secondary studies at St. Ephrem's Theological Seminary in Atchaneh, Lebanon. After graduating in 1982, he served as an assistant to Archbishop Mor Gregorios Yuhanna Ibrahim in Aleppo, Syria. Between 1984 and 1988, he attended the Coptic Theological Seminary in Cairo, Egypt, and received a Bachelor of Arts in Divinity.

In 1985, Saʿid Karim was ordained as a monk, and adopted the name Aphrem to honor the legacy of the Syriac poet-theologian Ephrem the Syrian and former patriarch Aphrem I Barsoum. He was ordained a deacon in Egypt and then elevated to priesthood later that year. From 1988 to 1989, he worked as the secretary to the former patriarch, Ignatius Zakka I Iwas. During this period, he also taught at St. Ephrem's Theological Seminary in Damascus, Syria.

In 1991, he entered St. Patrick's College in Maynooth, Ireland and received a Licentiate of Sacred Theology (1992) and a Doctor of Divinity (1994). His doctoral thesis was titled The Symbolism of the Cross in Early Syriac Christianity.

== Metropolitan archbishop of the Eastern United States ==
After the death of Archbishop Mor Athanasius Yeshue Samuel in 1995, who had established the Archdiocese of the United States and Canada, it was decided to reorganize the existing archdiocese into three distinct archdioceses: the Eastern United States, Los Angeles, and Canada.

On 28 January 1996, Patriarch Ignatius Zakka I Iwas consecrated Aphrem Karim as the patriarchal vicar and metropolitan archbishop of the Eastern United States at St. Virgin Mary's Syriac Orthodox church in his home town of Qamishli. He assumed the episcopal name Cyril, arrived in the United States on 2 March 1996, and was formally installed at St. Mark's Syriac Orthodox Cathedral in Teaneck, New Jersey, as Mor Cyril Aphrem Karim.

During his time as metropolitan archbishop, Cyril Aphrem Karim oversaw the creation of 11 new parishes, bringing the total parishes in the archdiocese to 20. He created an advisory council to aid in oversight and administration of the archdiocese. He created the Syriac Orthodox Archdiocesan Youth Organization to coordinate youth activities across the archdiocese's parishes, and oversaw a number of youth conferences as he sought to grow the church. He organized a special youth liturgy in the New York and New Jersey area and created a choral society.

Cyril Aphrem Karim oversaw the creation of the Archdiocesan Sunday School Committee to unite lesson plans across the archdiocese. He created a pre-marriage counseling program which afforded couples-to-be the chance to meet with him personally. He also established an annual liturgy service to recognize and appreciate the elderly members of the community. He worked for inter-church unity, serving on the World Council of Churches. Cyril Aphrem Karim played a significant role in founding Christian Churches Together.

== Accession to the patriarchate ==
On 21 March 2014, Patriarch Ignatius Zakka I Iwas died following a prolonged illness. After his death, the Holy Synod of the Syriac Orthodox Church of Antioch was convened to elect a successor. The synod was convened at St. Jacob Baradeus Monastery in Atchaneh, Lebanon.

Mor Baselios Thomas I, the then-Catholicos of India—along with Mor Severius Jamil Hawa, Archbishop of Baghdad and Basra and the patriarchal locum tenens—presided over the synod. Cyril Aphrem Karim was elected by the synod to be the 123rd successor of St. Peter in the Apostolic See of Antioch on 31 March 2014. Cyril Aphrem Karim was enthroned on 29 May 2014, at St. Ephrem's Monastery, Maarat Saidnaya, near Damascus, Syria. Baselios Thomas I oversaw the ceremony of consecration.

Aphrem adopted the patriarchal name Ignatius, replacing his episcopal name Cyril, and became the second patriarch to bear the monastic name Aphrem. Aphrem II decided not to include his family name, Karim, in his official title unlike his immediate predecessors.

=== Receptions ===
General Secretary Rev. Dr. Olav Fykse Tveit of the World Council of Churches congratulated Patriarch Aphrem II, highlighting his longstanding commitment to ecumenism. Pope Francis of the Roman Catholic Church extended congratulations and prayed that the Patriarch would be "a spiritual father for your people and an untiring builder of peace and justice". He was also congratulated by Karekin II of the Armenian Apostolic Church.

== Career as patriarch ==
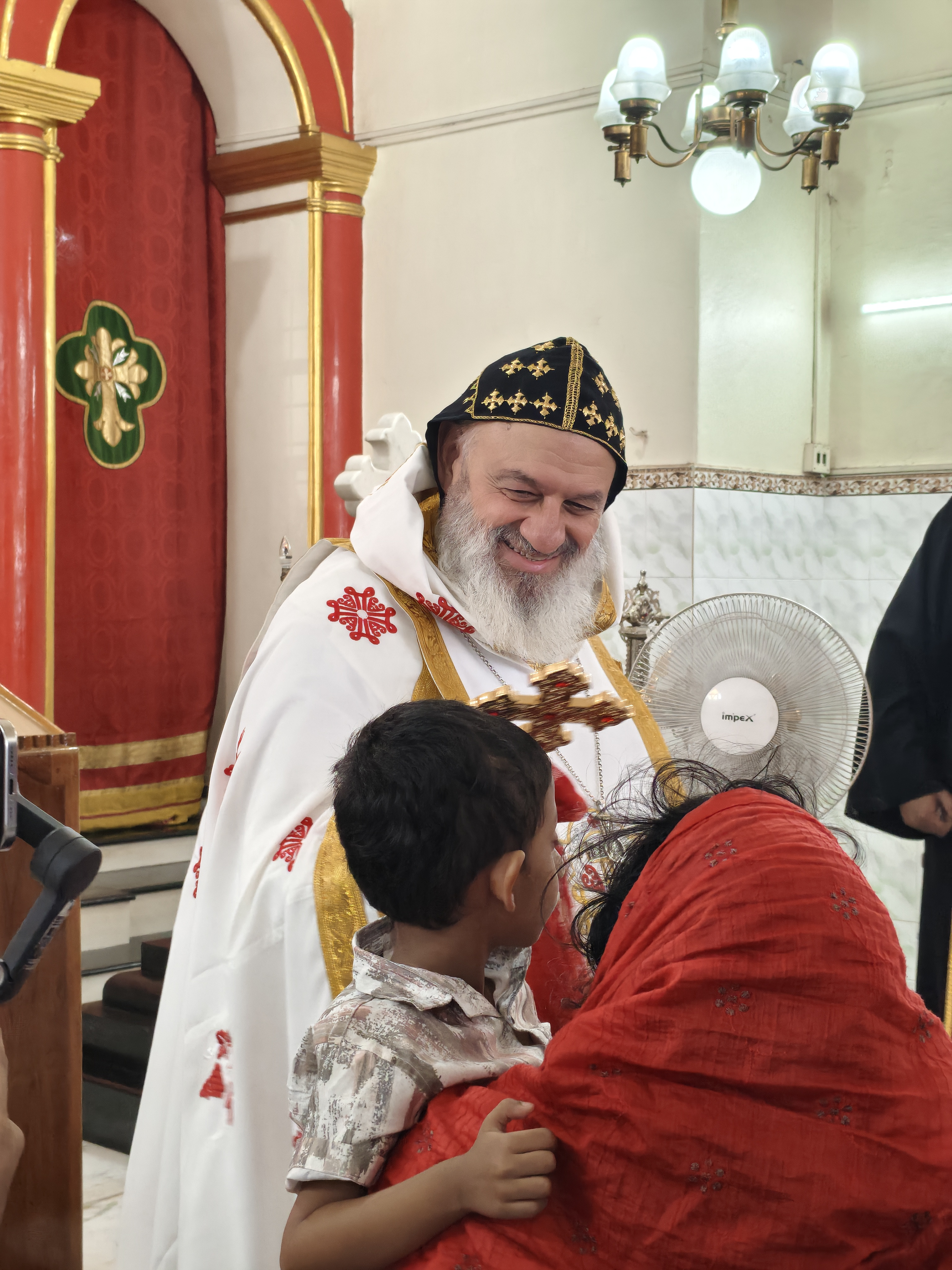
His Holiness Moran Mor Ignatius Aphrem II at St. Ignatius Monastery Manjinikkara

=== Travels abroad ===
Shortly after his election, Ignatius Aphrem II paid an official visit to the Holy See of Cilicia in Antelias, Lebanon to participate in a meeting to discuss higher levels of collaboration between the Syriac Orthodox and Armenian Apostolic Churches, as well as other Oriental Orthodox churches. In May 2015, Aphrem II was received by Carl XVI Gustaf and Queen Silvia of Sweden as he visited the country's Syriac Orthodox parishes.

Since his enthronement, he has made apostolic visits to Iraq and Syria to assist Christians displaced by the advance of ISIS and the general turmoil caused by the Syrian civil war. The patriarch also visited displaced Christians and refugee camps in Shaqlawa.

In 2022, Patriarch Aphrem II was received by the Vatican during a meeting with the International Catholic Legislators Network.

In 2024, Aphrem II received Catholicos-Patriarch of the Assyrian Church of the East Mar Awa III in Erbil during a meeting in September, which was also attended by Bashar Warda of the Chaldean Catholic Church. Around the fall of the Assad regime, Aphrem II was in Kerala, India for a 10-day visit, following the death of Catholicos Baselios Thomas I but it was cut short due to the military situation and political crises.

Aphrem II has also made several apostolic visits abroad since his enthronement as the Patriarch including in India, Switzerland, Austria, Netherlands and Germany. In March 2025, he ordained Baselios Joseph as Catholicos of India, and convened the Universal Synod of the Syriac Orthodox Church. In August 2025, he began a pastoral trip across the Tur Abdin region that lasted a week long, being received by several bishops and deputy governor of Mardin, Maher Gourieh. During the visit, Aphrem II remarked the great amount of progress made in the region, and his presence greatly boosted the morale of Assyrians in Turkey. He also got to meet with Zafer Sırakaya in an extended meeting with other bishops. In September 2025, Patriarch Aphrem II visited Syriac Orthodox churches in Canada as part of his second apostolic visit to Canada.

=== Suicide attack ===
On Sunday 19 June 2016, an ISIS-affiliated suicide bomber attempted to assassinate Aphrem II during a special ceremony commemorating the 101st anniversary of the Sayfo. The attacker was disguised as a priest and had detonated a bomb shortly after being stopped by security guards. Three security officers were killed and five people injured, including members of the Assyrian Sutoro; however, Aphrem II himself was unharmed.

=== 2026 Visit to India ===
In February 2026, he conducted a 10-day apostolic visit to India, his first major visit to the country in several years. On 27 February 2026, he was received by Prime Minister Narendra Modi in New Delhi. During the meeting, the prime minister expressed that he was honored to meet the patriarch, and the two discussed the historical ties between the Syriac Orthodox Church and India, which date back to the early centuries of Christianity.

A key focus of the discussions included the ongoing internal dispute within the Malankara church community in Kerala. Reports indicated that the patriarch and the prime minister held talks aimed at finding a lasting resolution to the conflict between the Jacobite and Orthodox factions. The Patriarch was accompanied by a high-level delegation, including Mor Baselios Joseph, the Catholicos of India, and other members of the Malankara Jacobite Syrian Christian Church episcopal synod.

=== Support for Syria ===
Speaking for a public television interview in New Jersey in 2013, Metropolitan Cyril Aphrem Karim opposed the possibility of United States airstrikes against Syria, citing his religious morals as well as the previous suffering of Syrians due to the events of the Syrian civil war.

In 2016, Aphrem II claimed "Russia has given hope to the people of Syria," in support of the Russian military intervention in Syria during the Syrian Civil War.

In April 2018, Ignatius Aphrem II, together with Greek Orthodox patriarch, John X of Antioch, and Youssef Absi of the Melkite Greek Catholic Church, issued a strong condemnation of the 2018 missile strikes against Syria. In their statement, they wrote that the bombings "were clear violations of the international laws and the UN Charter", and that the "unjust aggression encourages the terrorist organizations and gives them momentum to continue in their terrorism." The churches called on the United Nations Security Council and other churches in Syria to condemn the aggression, and saluted the Syrian Arab Armed Forces for protecting the country.

Aphrem II has previously been vocal about lifting the international sanctions against Syria, including a New Year's address around 2022 in Austria. In the wake of the 2025 massacres of Syrian Alawites, Aphrem II issued a statement alongside John X and Youssef Absi condemning the violence. In the statement, they wrote of the "dangerous escalation of violence, brutality, and killings, resulting in attacks on innocent civilians, including women and children" and called for a relaxation of conditions to further the stable transition of the country.

== Styles ==
The titulary of patriarchs is somewhat complex and changeable. He is often called "His Holiness" (Syriac: ܩܕܝܫܘܬܗ, romanized: Qādišūṯeh; Arabic: قداسة, romanized: Qadāsa), a special distinction given to the leaders of some churches. This is often followed by the unique Syriac title Mor (ܡܪܝ), often doubled to Moran Mor (ܡܪܢ ܡܪܝ). The title, in its singular form, literally means "my lord", and is given to all male saints and bishops. The term Moran means "our lord", and when used alone, it refers only to Jesus Christ, but is combined with Mor in the titles of patriarchs. Patriarchs are addressed as either Mor or Moran Mor.

The patriarch's name consists of the clerical name Ignatius in honor of the martyr Ignatius of Antioch, a tradition of the patriarchs of Antioch starting with the accession of Ignatius Youssef in 1293, followed by the patriarch's personal monastic name Aphrem, and the regnal number "II" to distinguish him from Ignatius Aphrem I Barsoum.

The patriarch is officially known as the Patriarch of Antioch, to which is added "and All the East" as that see governs the Church in the East. He is also termed as the Supreme Head of the Church, a similar title to those used by other denominational leaders. An ancient title of Syriac patriarchs of Antioch still sometimes used is "Thrice Blessed" (Syriac: ܬܠܝ݂ܬ݂ܝ ܛܘ݂ܒܐ, romanized: Tlīṯōy Ṭūbê), usually placed instead of "His Holiness".

Title of Ignatius Aphrem II
English	His Holiness Moran Mor Ignatius Aphrem II, Patriarch of Antioch and All the East and Supreme Head of the Universal Syriac Orthodox Church
Syriac	ܩܕܝܫܘܬܗ ܕܡܪܢ ܡܪܝ ܐܝܓܢܛܝܘܣ ܐܦܪܝܡ ܬܪܝܢܐ ܦܛܪܝܪܟܐ ܕܐܢܛܝܘܟܝܐ ܘܕܟܠܗ̇ ܡܕܢܚܐ ܘܪܝܫܐ ܓܘܢܝܐ ܕܥܕܬܐ ܣܘܪܝܝܬܐ ܬܪܝܨܬ ܫܘܒܚܐ ܒܟܠܗ̇ ܬܐܒܠ
Syriac	Qaddišuṯeh ḏ-Moran Mor[y] Iḡnaṭius Afrem Trayono Paṭriarḵo ḏ-Anṭiuḵia waḏ-Kuloh Maḏĕnḥo w-Rišo Gawonoyo ḏ-ʿItto Suryoyto Triṣaṯ Šuḇḥo ḇ-Kuloh Tiḇel
Arabic	قداسة مار إغناطيوس أفرام الثاني بطريرك لأنطاكية وسائر المشرق ورئيس أعلى للكنيسة السريانية الأرثوذكسية في العالم
Arabic	Qadāsa Mār ʾIġnāṭīūs ʾAfrām al-Ṯānī Baṭriyark li-ʾAnṭākya wa-Sāʾir al-Mašriq wa-Raʾīs ʾAʿlā lil-Kanīsa al-Suryāniyya al-ʾUrṯūḏaksiyya fī al-ʿĀlam

=== Personal names ===
At various points in his life, Ignatius Aphrem II was known as

- Saʿid Karim (1965–1985)
- The Reverend Monk Aphrem Karim (1985–1996)
- His Eminence Mor Cyril Aphrem Karim (1996–2014)
- His Holiness Moran Mor Ignatius Aphrem II (2014–present)

== Personal life ==
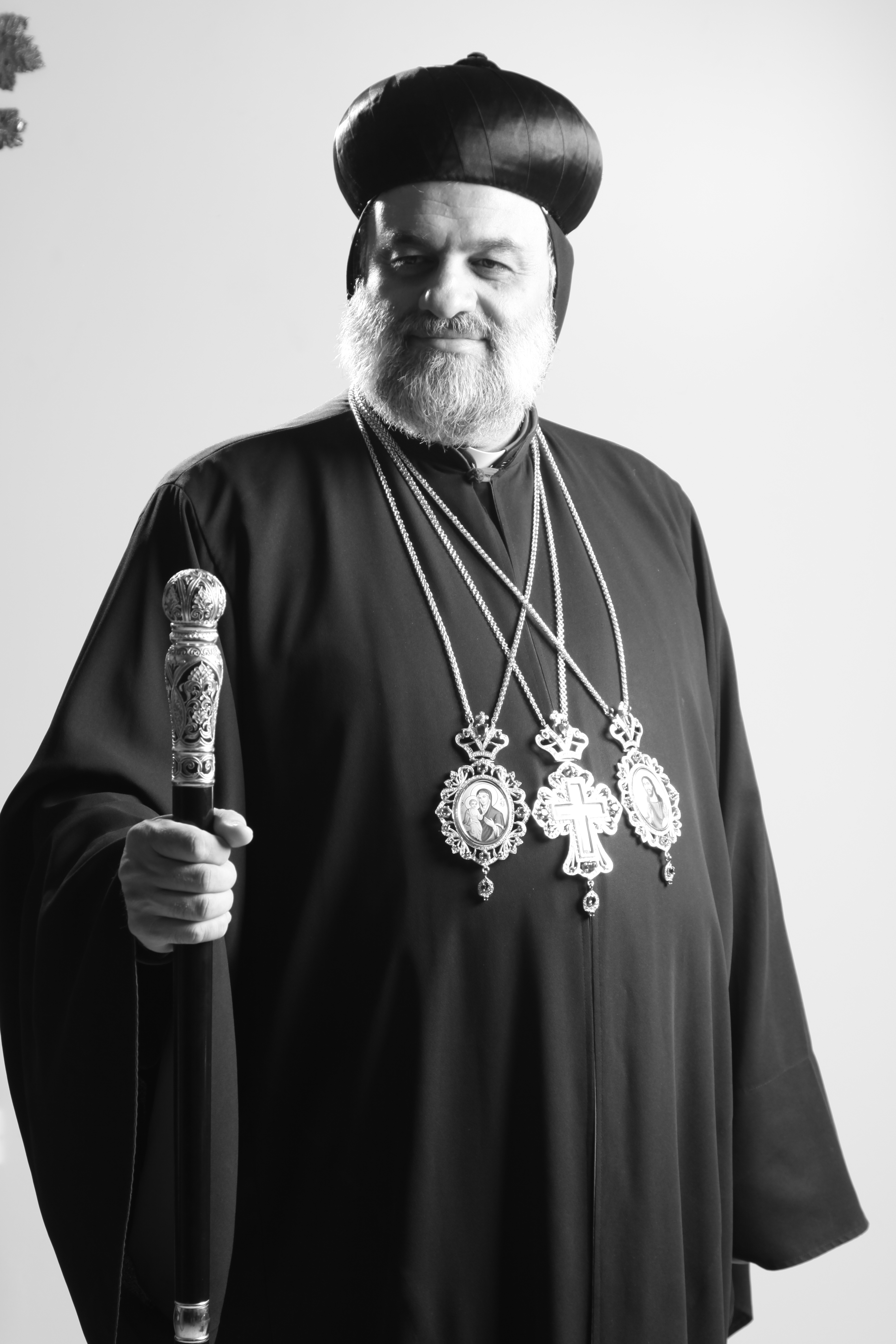
Publicity shot of His Holiness Patriarch Moran Mor Ignatius Aphrem II in black and white

Ignatius Aphrem II speaks Classical Syriac (Kthobonoyo) and Turoyo (a colloquial Neo-Aramaic spoken in his ancestral Tur Abdin), along with English, French, and Arabic.

In 2018, Aphrem II received an honorary degree from the National and Kapodistrian University of Athens in Zografou, Greece. The ceremony was attended by Ieronymos II of Athens and several Syriac Orthodox clergy, with Aphrem II delivering a speech about the status of Christianity in the Middle East.

=== Identity ===
Being the patriarch of the Syriac Orthodox Church, Aphrem II has previously spoken of the Aramaic roots and identity of the church, as well as his home country of Syria. However, in an interview with Assyria TV, he affirmed that the church's adherents should unite under one label ("Suryoye") outside of the Assyrian and Aramean designations that are used outside of the church's space, taking a more neutral stance on the Assyrian naming dispute. He also explained that he would not allow any political organization to represent the church by default.

Ignatius Aphrem II's stance on the dispute provoked discord from organizations that espoused an Aramean identity, namely the World Council of Arameans. In May 2015, a program on the WCA-run Suryoyo Sat questioned his call for unity and featured anti-Assyrian sentiment, with the same participants boycotting meetings with the patriarch. In 2017, Sabri Atman of the Seyfo Center criticized a letter sent by the WCA to Aphrem II demanding the addition the Aramean label to the name of the Syriac Orthodox Church, which was rejected by the patriarchate.

== Publications ==
In 2003, Cyril Aphrem Karim published the Book of the Order for the Burial of the Clergy. He also saw to the reprinting of works including the Shorter Catechism of the Syriac Orthodox Church of Antioch (1999) by former Patriarch Ignatius Aphrem I Barsoum, and the Book of Scripture Readings for Sundays and Feasts Days (2000), originally published by Mor Philoxenus Yuhanon Dolabani of Mardin. Cyril Aphrem Karim encouraged the American Foundation for Syriac Studies to publish a quarterly entitled Syriac Studies and helped co-sponsor a series of public lectures by scholars and intellectuals on Syriac culture, history, literature and theology. In 2004, Cyril Aphrem Karim wrote Symbols of the Cross in the Writings of the Early Syriac Fathers. He has also published two children's books: In The Tree House and Animals from the Bible.

=== Bibliography ===
- Barsom, Murad Saliba (2000). Samuel, Mor Athanasius Yeshue (ed.). Book of the Order for the Burial of the Clergy (liturgical book). Foreword by Mor Cyril Aphrem Karim; biographical sketch by Chorepiscopus John P. Meno. New Jersey: Archdiocese of the Syriac Orthodox Church for the Eastern USA. ISBN 0-9744442-0-0.
- Barsoum, Patriarch Ephrem I (1999). Karim, Cyril Aphrem (ed.). The Shorter Catechism of the Syrian Orthodox Church of Antioch. Translated into English by the Very Rev. Fr. Elias Sugar. New Jersey: Archdiocese of the Syriac Orthodox Church for the Eastern USA.
- Dolabani, Philoxenos Yuhanon (2000). Karim, Cyril Aphrem (ed.). Scripture Readings for Sundays & Feast Days: According to the Tradition of the Syrian Orthodox Church of Antioch. New Jersey: Archdiocese of the Syriac Orthodox Church for the Eastern USA. ISBN 1-59333-146-0.
- Karim, Cyril Aphrem (2004). Symbols of the Cross in the Writings of the Early Syriac Fathers. New Jersey: Gorgias Press. ISBN 1-59333-230-0.
- — (2004). "The Liturgy in the Syriac Orthodox Church of Antioch". In Best, Thomas F.; Heller, Dagmar (eds.). Worship Today: understanding, practice, ecumenical implications. Geneva: WCC.
- — (2011). In The Tree House (children's book). New Jersey: Parables & Books. ISBN 978-0983318804.
- — (2013). Animals from the Bible (children's book). New Jersey: Parables & Books. ISBN 978-1939682055.

== Notes ==
Preceded by Ignatius Zakka I Iwas	Syrian Orthodox Patriarch of Antioch; 2014–present	Succeeded by Incumbent
