= Baselios Paulose II =

Jacobite Maphrian of India (1914–1996)

His Beatitude Aboon Mor Baselios Paulose II
- Catholicos of the East and Malankara Metropolitan
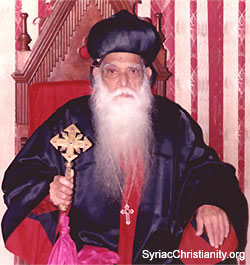
- Church: Syriac Orthodox Church
- See: Malankara Syriac Orthodox Church
- In office: 1975–1996
- Predecessor: Baselios Augen I
- Successor: Baselios Thomas I
- Other posts: Malankara Metropolitan, Metropolitan of Kandanad Diocese

Orders
- Ordination: 1938 by Yulios Elias Qoro
- Consecration: 25 April 1952 by Ignatius Aphrem I

Personal details
- Born: 12 June 1914 Cherai, India
- Died: 1 September 1996 (aged 82) India
- Buried: St. George's Monastery, Malekurish
- Denomination: Oriental Orthodox

Mor Baselios Paulose II (Syr: ܡܳܪܝ ܒܰܣܺܝܠܺܝܳܘܣ ܦܰܘܠܽܘܣ ܬܪܶܝܳܢܳܐ; Mal: മോർ ബസേലിയോസ് പൗലോസ് ദ്വിതീയൻ; born Puthusseril Joseph Paulose (12 June 1914 - 1 September 1996) was the 79th Maphrian of the Syriac Orthodox Church, 2nd Catholicos of the East and 22nd Malankara Metropolitan of Malankara Syriac Orthodox Church. He also served as the Metropolitan of the Kandanad Diocese.

== Early life ==
Paulose was born on 12 June 1914 to the Vicar of Cherai St Mary's Church, Kasheesho Puthusseril Joseph and Eralil Elizabeth of Vadakkan Paravoor. He was named P. J. Paulose and completed his secondary education at Cherai Ramavarma High School. After completing college education at Kottayam CMS College and Alwaye Union Christian College, Paulose joined the Manjinikkara Dayaro. Paulose continued his Syriac education under Rabban Abdul Ahad (later Patriarch Yaqub III).

== Holy Orders ==
=== Priesthood ===
In 1934, Yulius Elias, the delegate of the Patriarch to Malankara, ordained Paulose as deacon. In 1938, Yulius ordained him priest at Manjinikkara Dayaro (Monastery). Later Paulose became secretary to Yulius and malphono at Manjinikkara Dayaro.

=== Metropolitan ===
On 25 April 1952, the Kandanad diocesan delegates meeting selected 'Kasheesho' Paulose to succeed Athanasius Paulose who had therelinquished his additional duties as the metropolitan of Kandanad due to illness. Patriarch Ignatius Aphrem I Barsoum ordained Paulose P. J. with the name Mor Philoxenus on 19 October 1952 at Homs, Syria.

=== Catholicos ===
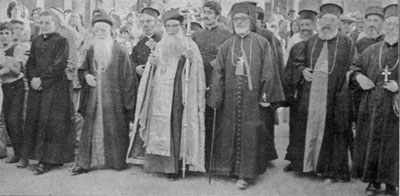
Catholicos Mor Baselios Paulose II proceeding to the Patriarchal Cathedral, accompanied by Metropolitans, and clergy for the enthronement ceremony of H.H. the Patriarch Zakka-I Iwas

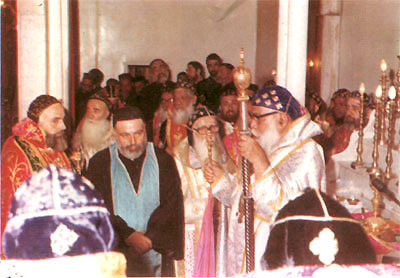
His Beatitude Mor Baselios Paulose II, Catholicos of the East leading the enthronement ceremony of the Patriarch of Antioch & all the East, H.H. Mor Ignatius Zakka I Iywas on Sep 14, 1980 at the St.George Cathedral, Damascus, Syria

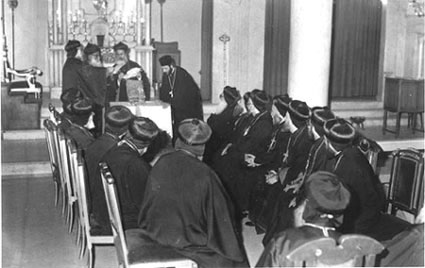
The Catholicos of the East His Beatitude Baselios Paulose II, officially announcing the name of the newly elected Patriarch Zakka Iywas in the Episcopal Synod of the Universal Syrian Orthodox Church of Antioch & all the East - 1980

On 7 September 1975, Ignatius Jacob III consecrated Philoxenus as Catholicos of India. On 14 September 1980, he consecrated Ignatios Zakka I Iwas, Archbishop of Baghdad, as the Syriac Orthodox Patriarch of Antioch; this was the first time in the long history of the Patriarchate of Antioch that a bishop from Malankara officiated at the consecration of a Patriarch. He also ordained six bishops for the Malankara Jacobite Syriac Orthodox Church, ( Jacobite Syrian Christian Church).

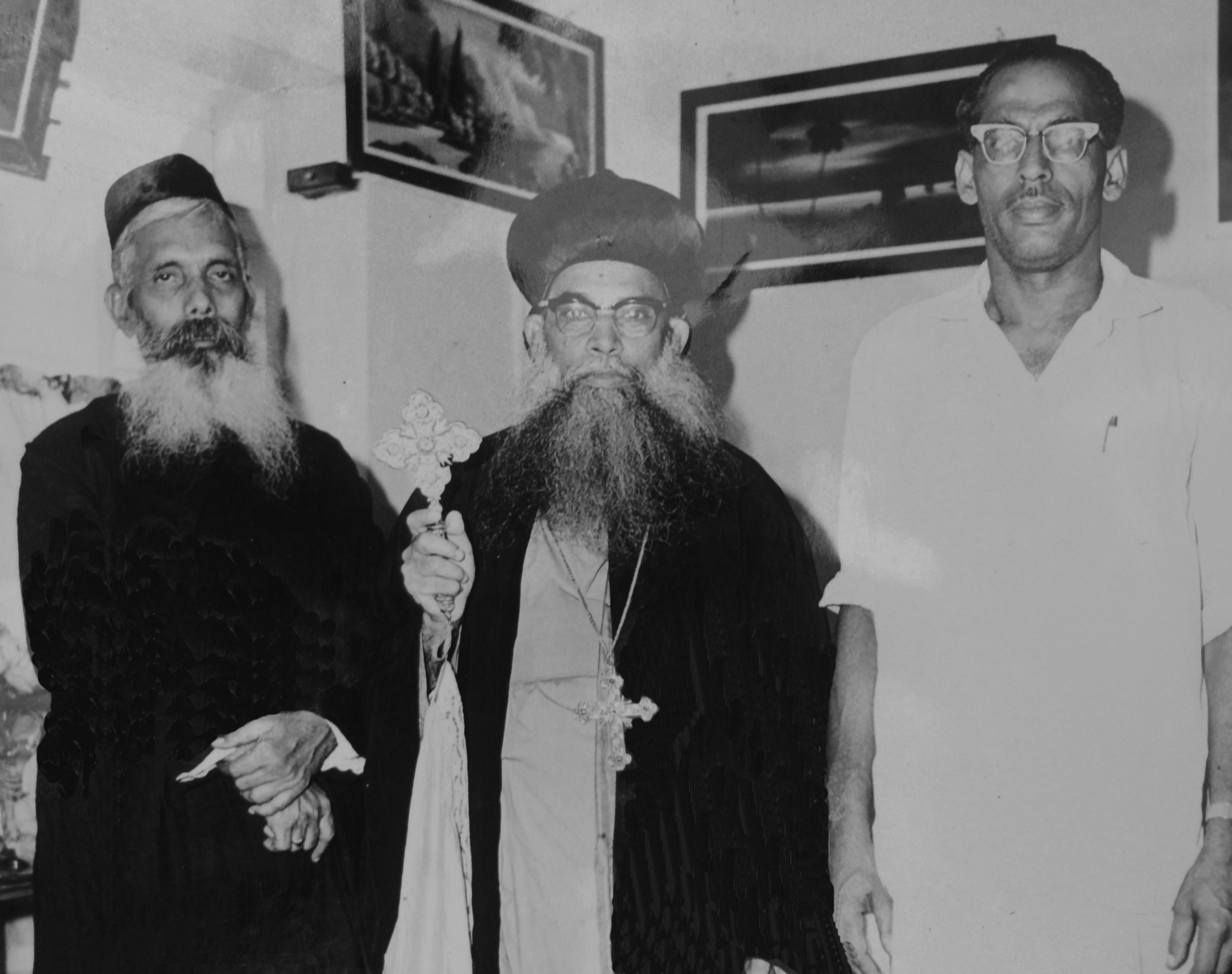
Baselios Paulose II, Malphono Naseeho Fr. Athungal Corepiscopos with K. O. Varghese Kaniyampadikkal

== Death and entombment ==
Went to heavenly abode on 1 September 1996. The remains of Catholicos Basileus Paulose II are interred in a tomb in St. George's Monastery, Malekurish near Puthenkurishu in Ernakulam District, Kerala.

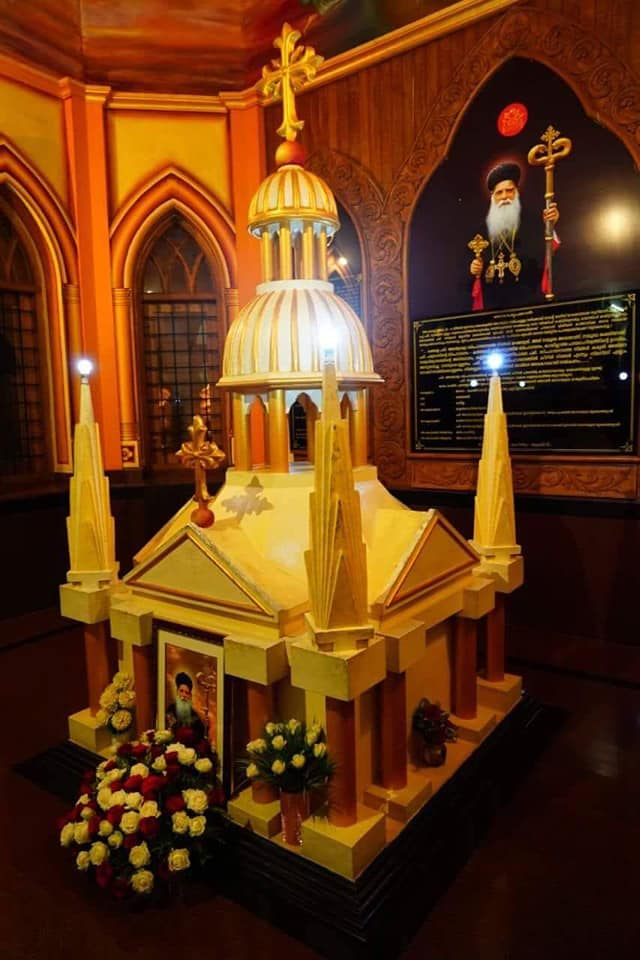
Tomb of Baselios Paulose II

== See also ==
- List of Syriac Orthodox Patriarchs of Antioch
- List of Maphrians
- Syriac Christianity
- Saint Thomas Christians

'Malankara Syriac Orthodox Church Titles
Preceded by Baselios Augen I 1964-1975	Maphrian of the Syriac Orthodox Church; Catholicos of India; 1975-1996	Succeeded by Baselios Thomas I 2002-2024
Preceded by Baselios Augen I 1964-1975	Metropolitan Trustee of Jacobite Syrian Christian Church; 1975-1996	Succeeded by Geevarghese Gregorios; 1996-1999
