= Geevarghese Gregorios of Perumpally =

Indian Syriac Orthodox bishop (1933-1999)

His Eminence Dr. Geevarghese Mor Gregorios
- Malankara Metropolitan
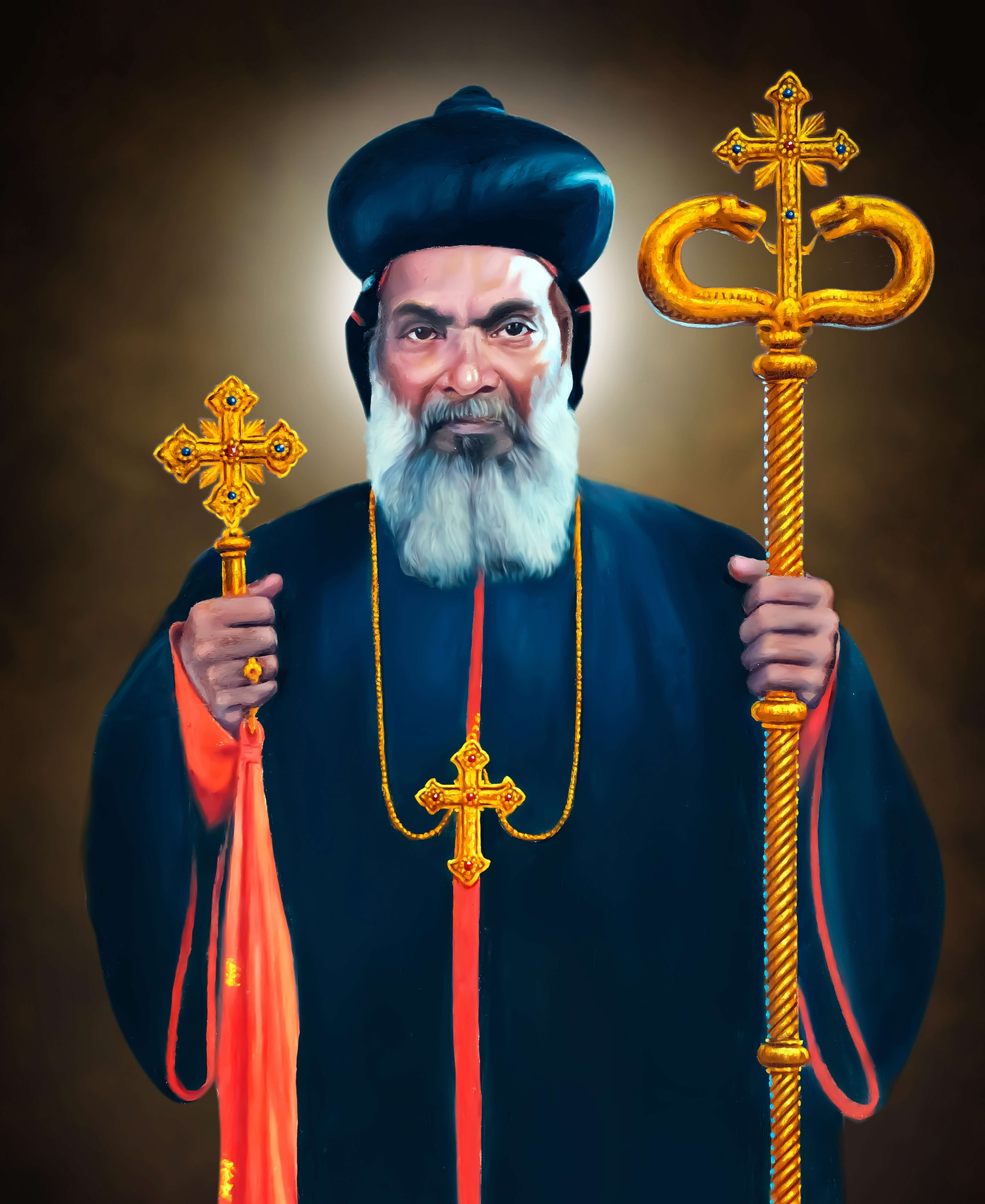
- Church: Syriac Orthodox Church (Malankara Jacobite Church)
- Predecessor: Baselios Paulose II
- Successor: Philoxenos Yuhanon

Orders
- Ordination: 1 August 1958
- Consecration: 24 February 1974

Personal details
- Born: 10 October 1933 Puthupally, Kerala, India
- Died: 22 February 1999 Cochin, Kerala, India
- Buried: Perumpally Simhasana Church
- Denomination: Oriental Orthodox
- Parents: Mathew Asan Parapallil and Annamma

Gregorios Geevarghese (Perumpally Thirumeni) (10 October 1933 – 22 February 1999) was a Syriac Orthodox bishop who served as the de facto 23rd Malankara Metropolitan of the Malankara Syriac Orthodox Church, President of the Episcopal Synod of the Church in India, President of the Synod of the Malankara Jacobite Syrian Orthodox Church and the Metropolitan of Cochin, Kottayam, Kollam, Niranam and Thumpamon Dioceses.

== Beginnings ==
Geevarghese was born in the ancient aristocratic family of Parapallil in Puthupally, Kottayam as the third son of Mathew Asan and Annamma. His father died when he was very young and he was taken care of by his elder brother P.M.Mathew.

Geevarghese received his theological education at Thrikkothamangalam Mor Sharbil Dayro and Manjanikkara Mor Ignatius Dayro.

He was ordained priest by Yulios Elias Qoro on 1 August 1958 and for several years served as the vicar of St. George's Simhasana Church, Perumpally.

== Bishopric ==
Fr. Geevarghese was elected to the episcopate by the Malankara Jacobite Syrian Christian Association meeting at St. George Jacobite Syrian Cathedral, Karingachira in January 1974. Consecrated metropolitan alongside Mor Dionysius Thomas by Patriarch Ignatius Ya`qub III on 24 February 1974 for Cochin diocese with additional charge of Kottayam diocese, Gregorios became the Metropolitan of Kottayam after the 1982 Synod at Cochin presided by Patriarch Ignatius Zakka I Iwas. In the early 1970s, when the church in Malankara became divided again over the role of the Patriarchate of Antioch, Mor Gregorios and Mor Dionysius led the faithful who maintained their spiritual association with Antioch, under the leadership of Mor Baselios Paulose II. For their efforts they were called "Bar Regesh" or "Sons of Thunder". Following the death of Catholicos Baselios Paulose II on 2 September 1996, Mor Gregorios presided over the Episcopal Synod and the Synod of the Malankara Syriac Orthodox Church until his own death.

== Death ==
Mor Gregorios died on 22 February 1999 from a kidney disease. His remains are interred in the sanctuary of the Perumpally Simhasana Church. Patriarch Ignatius Zakka I Iwas visited this church in April 2000 to offer memorial prayers at his tomb.

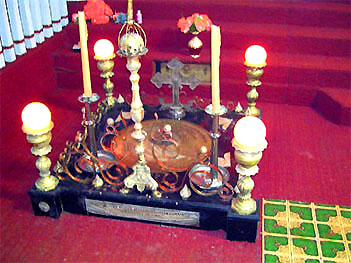
Perumpally Thirumeni's final resting place

== Legacy ==
Mor Gregorios Geevarghese wrote many of the prayer songs of the Malankara Syriac Orthodox Church. Many church buildings were named in memory of Geevarghese Gregorios. He started the Hail Mary Residential School at Perumpally.

'Malankara Syriac Orthodox Church Titles
Preceded by Baselios Paulose II; 1975-1996	President of the Episcopal Synod of Jacobite Syrian Christian Church; 1996–1999	Succeeded by Yuhanon Philoxenos; 1999-2002
