= Ignatius Zakka I =

122nd Patriarch of Syriac Orthodox Church of Antioch (1980–2014)

His Holiness Moran Mor Ignatius Zakka I Iwas Patriarch of Antioch and All the East
- 122nd Patriarch of the Universal Syriac Orthodox Church
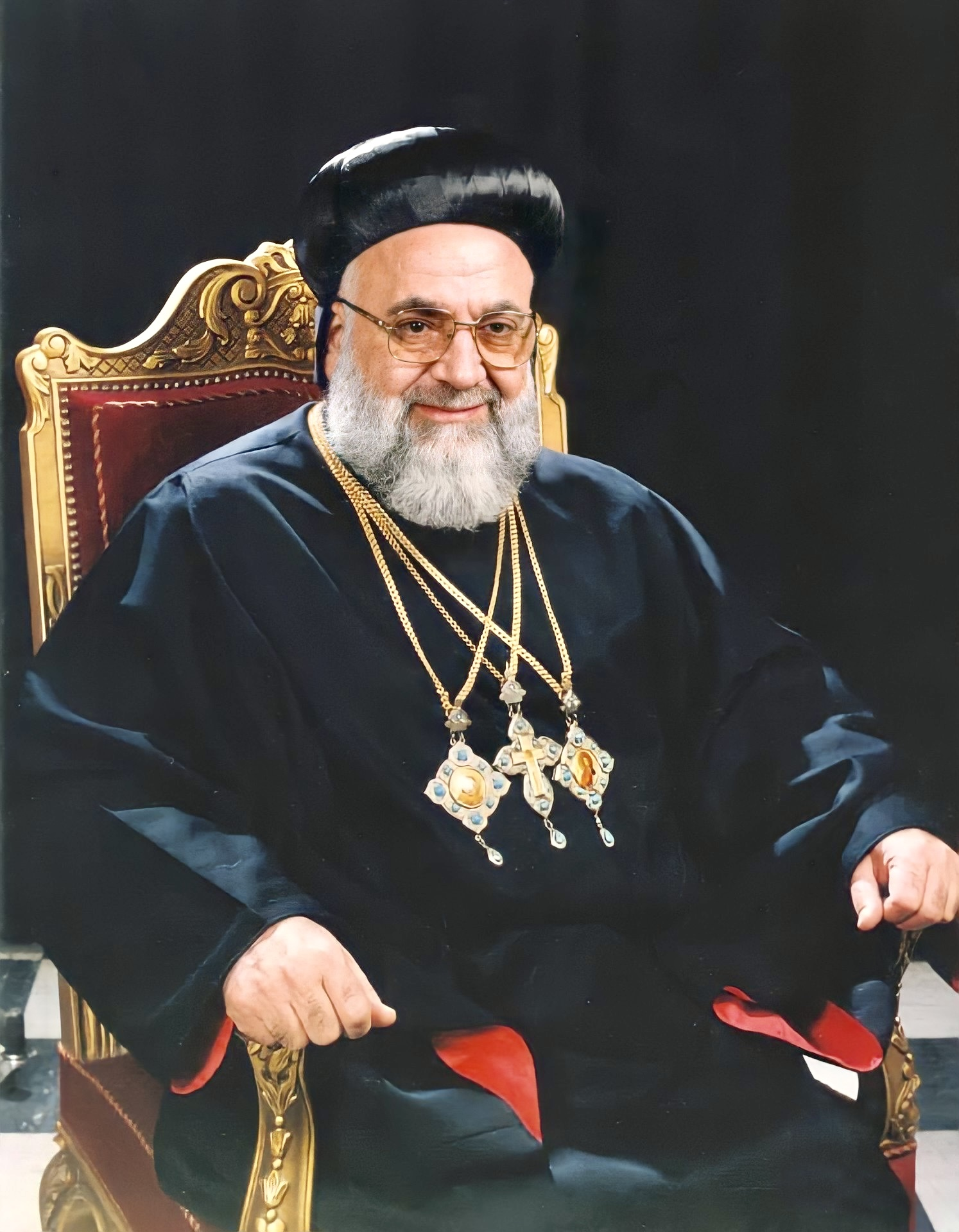
- Native name: ܐܝܓܢܐܛܝܘܣ ܙܟܝ ܩܕܡܝܐ ܥܝܘܐܨ إغناطيوس زكا الأول عيواص,
- Church: Syriac Orthodox Church
- See: See of Antioch
- Appointed: 14 September 1980
- Term ended: 21 March 2014
- Predecessor: Ignatius Ya`qub III
- Successor: Ignatius Aphrem II
- Previous posts: Archbishop of Baghdad and Basra; Archbishop of Central Europe; Metropolitan Bishop of Mosul

Orders
- Ordination: 17 November 1957
- Consecration: 17 November 1963 (as Bishop); 14 September 1980 (as Patriarch) by Ignatius Ya`qub III (as bishop); Baselios Paulose II (as Patriarch)

Personal details
- Born: Sanharib Iwas; 21 April 1931 Mosul, Iraq
- Died: 21 March 2014 (aged 82) Kiel, Germany
- Buried: Sts. Paul and Peter Cathedral, Maarat Saidnaya, Damascus, Syria
- Denomination: Syriac Orthodox
- Education: City University of New York; General Theological Seminary

Mor Ignatius Zakka I Iwas (Syriac: ܐܝܓܢܐܛܝܘܣ ܙܟܝ ܩܕܡܝܐ ܥܝܘܐܨ; Arabic: إغناطيوس زكا الأول عيواص; Ignatios Zakkà ‘Īwāṣ, born Sanharib Iwas, 21 April 1931 – 21 March 2014) was the 122nd reigning Syriac Orthodox Patriarch of Antioch and All the East and, as such, Supreme Head of the Universal Syriac Orthodox Church. Also known by his traditional episcopal name, Severios, he was enthroned as patriarch on 14 September 1980 in St. George's Patriarchal Cathedral in Damascus. He succeeded Ignatius Ya`qub III. As is traditional for the head of the church, Mor Severios adopted the name Ignatius.

Zakka was known for his involvement in ecumenical dialogue. He was a president of the World Council of Churches and also a prolific author. He was an observer at Second Vatican Council before becoming metropolitan bishop of Mosul. At the time of his election as patriarch, Mor Severios Zakka was serving as the archbishop of Baghdad and Basra. As patriarch, he established a monastic seminary, met with Pope John Paul II during the Roman Pope's visit to Syria in 2001, and installed numerous metropolitans, including Baselios Thomas I as Catholicos of India. He celebrated his Silver Jubilee in 2005.

Iwas was admitted to a hospital in Germany for angioplasty on 20 February 2014 and died on 21 March 2014.

== Early life and education ==
Sanharib Iwas was born on 21 April 1931 in Mosul, Iraq. His parents named him after Sennacherib, the father of St. Behnam. He completed his elementary studies at the school of Our Lady's Parish and was transferred to St. Thomas Syriac Orthodox Church School, both in Mosul. In 1946, he began his theological studies in the city's Mor Ephrem seminary. At the seminary, his birth name was replaced by the name Zakka. There, in 1948, he was ordained as a deacon with the rank of Reader. In 1953, he was promoted to the rank of subdeacon. The following year saw Iwas take monastic vows. He left Mosul at that time to become secretary to the patriarchs, Ignatius Aphrem I Barsoum and then Ignatius Jacob III. In 1955 he was promoted to the rank of full deacon.

On 17 November 1957, Patriarch Ya`qub III ordained Deacon Zakka a priest and, two years later, gave him the pectoral cross as rabban. In 1960, he pursued further study in New York City. There, he studied oriental languages and completed a master's degree in English at the City University and a further master's in pastoral theology at the General Theological Seminary.

== Metropolitan bishop ==
In 1962 and 1963, Rabban Zakka was delegated by the patriarch as an observer at Second Vatican Council. On 17 November 1963, he was consecrated metropolitan bishop by Patriarch Ya'qub with the name Mor Severios Zakka. The next year, during renovation work on the sanctuary wall of the metropolitan church in Mosul, what were reputed to be the remains of the Apostle Thomas were found. In 1969, Mor Severios transferred to be archbishop of Baghdad and Basra. Nine years later, he was given additional responsibility for the new diocese of Australia.

== Patriarch of Syriac Orthodox Church ==
Following the death of Patriarch Ya`qub III on 25 June 1980, Mor Severios Zakka was elected by the synod of the church to succeed him the 122nd Syriac Patriarch of Antioch. He was enthroned as patriarch on 14 September, the day of the feast of the Cross, by Mor Baselios Paulose (Paul) II, Catholicos of the East, at St. George's Patriarchal Cathedral in Damascus, Syria. As is traditional for the head of the church, he adopted the name Ignatius at this time. Being the first patriarch to be named Zakka, his name is often written as Ignatius Zakka I Iwas. His full titulary is:

Syriac: ܩܕܝܫܘܬܗ ܡܪܢ ܡܪܝ ܐܝܓܢܐܛܝܘܣ ܙܟܝ ܩܕܡܝܐ ܥܝܘܐܨ܃ ܦܛܪܝܪܟܐ ܕܐܢܛܝܘܟܝܐ
transliteration: Qaddîšûṯeh Îgnaṭyûs Zakkay Qaḏmoyo ʿÎwaṣ, Paṭryarḵo d-Anṭyuḵya
English: His Holiness Ignatius Zakka I Iwas, Patriarch of Antioch

Patriarch Zakka, was involved in ecumenical dialogue and served as the president of the World Council of Churches. Due to his efforts, the Chalcedonian schism is not seen to have great relevance any more and, from dialogue with the Roman pope, a reconciling declaration emerged that stated, in part:

The confusions and schisms that occurred between their Churches in the later centuries, they realize today, in no way affect or touch the substance of their faith, since these arose only because of differences in terminology and culture and in the various formulae adopted by different theological schools to express the same matter. Accordingly, we find today no real basis for the sad divisions and schisms that subsequently arose between us concerning the doctrine of Incarnation. In words and life we confess the true doctrine concerning Christ our Lord, notwithstanding the differences in interpretation of such a doctrine which arose at the time of the Council of Chalcedon.

Zakka was a member of different Eastern and Western Academies and authored a number of books on Christian education, theology, history, and culture in Syriac and the Arabic and English languages. He established a monastic seminary, the Monastery of St. Ephrem The Syrian, at Marrat Saidnaya. Inaugurated on 14 September 1996, this Monastery forms part of a larger project which will include different centers and facilities. During the visit of Pope John Paul II to Syria in 2001, the Pope paid a historic visit to Patriarch Zakka in Damascus. The meeting took place on 6 May in St. George's Patriarchal Cathedral at Bab Touma. The following year, Iwas installed Mor Dionysius Thomas, the president of the Episcopal Synod of Indian Church, as the Catholicos of India with the title Mor Baselios Thomas I. Celebrations were held for the Patriarch's Silver Jubilee on 14 September 2005.

=== Pastoral visits ===
Ignatius Zakka made a number of pastoral visits outside Syria, mainly to India where the bulk of Syriac Orthodox Christians reside and Europe, home of the growing Syriac Orthodox diaspora. His first pastoral visit was to India was to Kerala from 3 February to 27 March 1982, during which he met with Indian officials and heads of various Indian churches. A second visit to India was in April 2000 to attend the Golden Jubilee of the Chief Metropolitan of the East Mor Cleemis Abraham, it lasted three days. The third visit to India came for the occasion of the 25th anniversary celebrations of the Patriarchal enthronement in September 2004, the third visit lasted two weeks. The fourth and last visit was in 2008 for the 80th Birthday celebration of Catholicos Mor Baselios Thomas I which also lasted two weeks.

== Episcopal succession ==
During Ignatius Zakka time as Patriarch and Metropolitan, he had the duty to ordain and consecrate many Metropolitans in the Syriac Orthodox church in addition to 66 monks and nuns and hundreds of priests and deacons. The list includes one future patriarch also.

1. Cyril Aphrem Karim (1996–2014). Metropolitan of the Eastern United States. Later, he was elected as Ignatius Aphrem II, the 123rd Patriarch of Syriac Orthodox Church (2014–Present).
2. Theophilus George Saliba (1981). Metropolitan of Mount Lebanon
3. Severus Isaac Saka (1981). Patriarchal Vicar for Syriac Studies
4. Philoxenus Elias Malke (1982–1984). Metropolitan of Tur-Abdin
5. Christimous Moosa Salama (1982). Patriarchal Vicar in Brazil
6. Severus Abrohom (1982). Metropolitan Assistant in India
7. Eustatius Benjamin (1984). Metropolitan in India
8. Timothy Samuel Aktash (1985). Metropolitan of Diyarbakir
9. Philoxenus Yousef (1986). Patriarchal vicar in Istanbul
10. Julius Abdulahad Shabo (1987). Metropolitan of Sweden
11. Iwannis Paul (1990). Bishop and Patriarchal Vican in Damascus
12. Pulicarpus M.B. George (1990). Metropolitan for Eastern Society Evangelism
13. Eustatius MAtta Rohem (1990). Metropolitan of Al-Jazira and Al-Furat
14. Malatius John Rajan (1990). Metropolitan of Trishur in India
15. Clement Augin Kabalan (1991). Metropolitan of the Western United States
16. Nicolas Zakariya (1993). Metropolitan for Indian dioceses in US & Canada
17. Gregorius Joseph (1996). Metropolitan of Kugin in India
18. Dioscorus Benjamin Atash. Patriarchal vicar in Sweden
19. Severus Malke (1996). Patriarchal vicar Jerusalem, Jordan and the Holy Lands
20. Dionysius Issa Karbouz (1996). Patriarchal vicar in Germany
21. Julius Qariaqus (1998). Patriarch secretary and Patriarchal vicar in India
22. Selwanus Peter (1999–2020). Metropolitan for Homs and Hama
23. Severus Saliba Toma (2000). Patriarchal vicar in Zahle and Bakaa'

== Death ==
Zakka was admitted to hospital in Kiel, Germany on 20 February 2014; where he died following a cardiac arrest on 21 March 2014. He was entombed at St. Peter's and St Paul's Cathedral, Marrat Saidnayya, Damascus on 28 March.

On 29 May 2014, Mor Ignatius Aphrem II, succeeded him as Patriarch.

== See also ==
- List of Syriac Orthodox Patriarchs of Antioch
- Malankara Jacobite Syriac Orthodox Church

Religious titles
Preceded by Ignatius Jacob III	Syriac Orthodox Patriarch of Antioch; 1980–2014	Succeeded by Ignatius Aphrem II
