= St. Mary's Church, Meenangadi =

- E. A. E St. Mary's 'Soonoro' Syrian Orthodox Pilgrim Church Meenangadi
- ഇ.ഏ.ഇ സെന്‍റ് മേരീസ് 'സൂനോറോ' സുറിയാനി ഓർത്തഡോക്സ് തീർത്ഥാടന കേന്ദ്രം, മീനങ്ങാടി
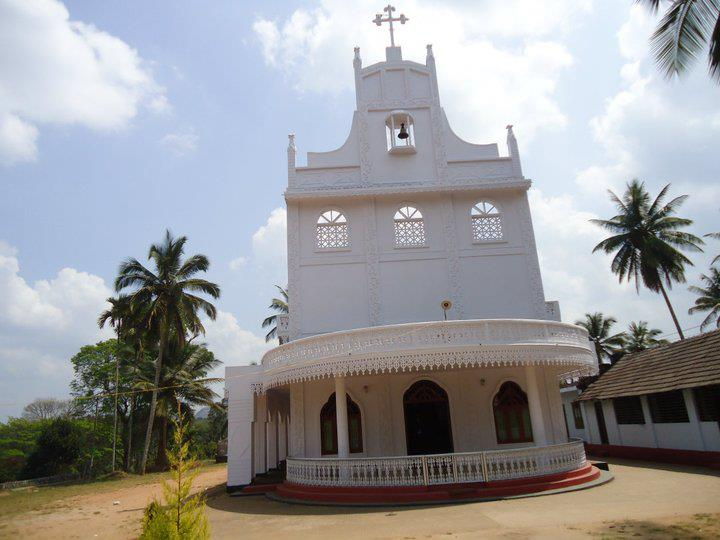

- Location in Kerala, India
- 11°39′34″N 76°10′03″E
- Location: Meenangadi (Post), Wayanad District, Kerala
- Country: India
- Denomination: Syriac Orthodox
- Tradition: Malankara Church

History
- Status: Soonoro Pilgrim Centre
- Founded: 1957
- Dedication: Saint Mary, Saint Thomas, Saint George
- Consecrated: 1 February 1958

Architecture
- Architectural type: Church
- Completed: 1991

Administration
- District: Wayanad district
- Archdiocese: E.A.E Arch Diocese

Clergy
- Bishop: Mor Chrysostomos Markose Metropolitan
- Vicar: Rev. Fr. Varghese Kakkattil

E. A. E St. Mary's Soonoro Syriac Orthodox Church, Meenangadi (Malayalam: സെന്‍റ് മേരീസ് 'സൂനോറോ' തീര്‍ത്ഥാടന കേന്ദ്രം മീനങ്ങാടി), is a Marian Pilgrim center of the Syriac Orthodox Church located at Meenangadi in Kerala, India. The church is under E.A.E Arch Diocese, (Malayalam: പൗരസ്ത്യ സുവിശേഷ സമാജം) the first missionary association of Syriac Orthodox Patriarchate of Antioch and All the East, and is currently under the direct control of Ignatius Aphrem II, Patriarch of the Syriac Orthodox Church. In 2006, the church was elevated to the status of "Marian Pilgrim Centre", and in 2018, it celebrated its diamond jubilee. It is the first church to adopt the 8 Day Lent in Malabar Region.

== Feasts ==
- 1 February – Commemorative of the Foundation Day of the Church.
- 2 February – Commemoration of Ignatius Elias III.
- 23 April – Commemoration of St. George.
- 1–8 September – Feast of the Saint Mary's birth – Thousands attend the annual 8 Day Lent celebration, known as Ettu Nombu Perunnal.
- November – Commemoration of Gheevarghese Mar Gregorios of Parumala (Parumala Thirumeni (Bishop of Parumala) or Chathuruthiyil Kochu Thirumeni).
- Mor Basil Chapel, Mepperikunnu-Commemoration of Baselios Yeldo.
- 24 December – Commemoration of the Nativity of Jesus.

== History ==
The migration of Syrian Christian families from Travancore, especially from Kothamangalam, Perumbavoor and Muvattupuzha to India's Malabar region started in the early 1920s.

St. Thomas Church Malankarakunnu was one of the first churches of Syrian Christians but due to the lack of transport in rural areas, the people had no access to the church so new parishes were established, Meenangadi was a major trade hub of the Malabar region. The 20th century schism of the Malankara Church caused a feud between members of the church, leading to their isolation. In 1958, a caucus excluded some parishioners from holy sacraments and forced them to move to other parishes for their sacraments. This led to the establishment of the Meenangadi church. According to a local tradition, the parishioners fasted and prayed according to a bible verse they found; 2 Chronicles 7:12. Under the leadership of K.O Varghese, a parishioner built a temporary prayer shed on high terrain on his land at Meenangadi town. E.A.E missionary Corepiscoppa Geevarghese Athunkal, the founder of Evangelistic Association Of The East (EAE) discussed the establishment of a church.

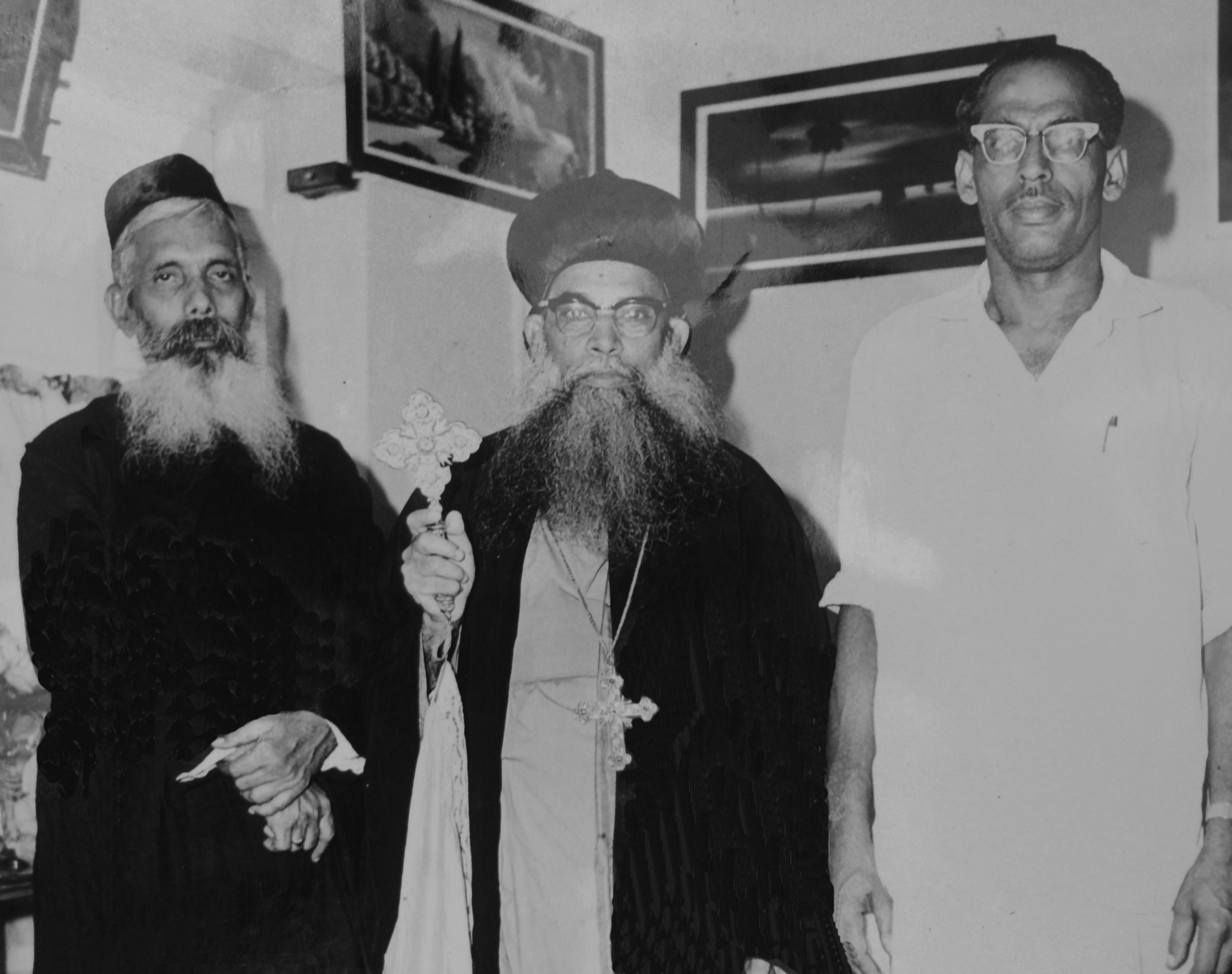
H.B Baselious Paulose II, Very.Rev Malphono Naseeho Athungal Coreppiscoppa with K. O. Varghese

Mor Yulios Elias Qoro, third patriarchal delegate to Malankara, approved the order for a church from the guidance of patriarch Ignatius Jacob III. The new, independent church was built in the name of St. Mary. The fathers of the church renovated the building. The church was consecrated and the foundation stone was laid on 1 February 1958. The first Holy Mass was celebrated by Vicar Malphono Naseeho Geevarghese Athunkal Corepiscoppa. In 1974, Geevarghese Mor Gregorios Perumpally, Thomas Mor Dhivanyasos (Baselios Thomas I) arrived to the church and consecrated the St.Mary's shrine. In 1976, a youth association was started in the church. In 1982 there was a grand welcome for the Apostolic Visit of Patriarch of Antioch Moran Mor Ignatius Zakka I Iwas to the church, and Baselios Paulose II Catholicos, Mor Athanasius Paulose II Metropolitan and Mor Polycarpose Geevarghese, also supported the church. Baselios Paulose II visited the church frequently and gifted relics of Ignatius Elias III to the church. which was installed by Mor Polycarpose Geevarghese and the Holy Soonoro was installed on 28 April 1991.

== Relics ==
=== Holy Soonoro (Holy Girdle of St.Mary) ===
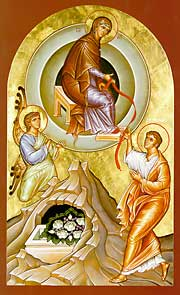
Depiction of the Soonoro giving her Girdle to Thomas the Apostle. Below is a styllized representation of Mary's Tomb, with flowers lying on the sarcophagus.

According to Oriental Orthodox Church tradition, the Virgin Mary died in the presence of all apostles except Thomas the Apostle. At the time of the assumption, Thomas was in India and he returned to Jerusalem and travelled on the sky by the help of Holy Spirit to attend the assumption of Mary. He arrived late and the saint visualised that Mary's body was taken by the Angels. At that time, St. Thomas could reach there. Thomas had doubtful nature; to persuade others, he asked Mary to give him a sign of her for her memory and remembrance. Then a chariot stopped in the air and Mary gave her girdle (soonoro) to Thomas. He showed this girdle to other disciples of Jesus and convinced them. He took the girdle on his journey. Many miracles have been reported after people have seen or touched this girdle. It was taken to Şanlıurfa and was then kept in a church in Homs, Syria. The original girdle is a relic belonging to Saint Mary Church of the Holy Belt.

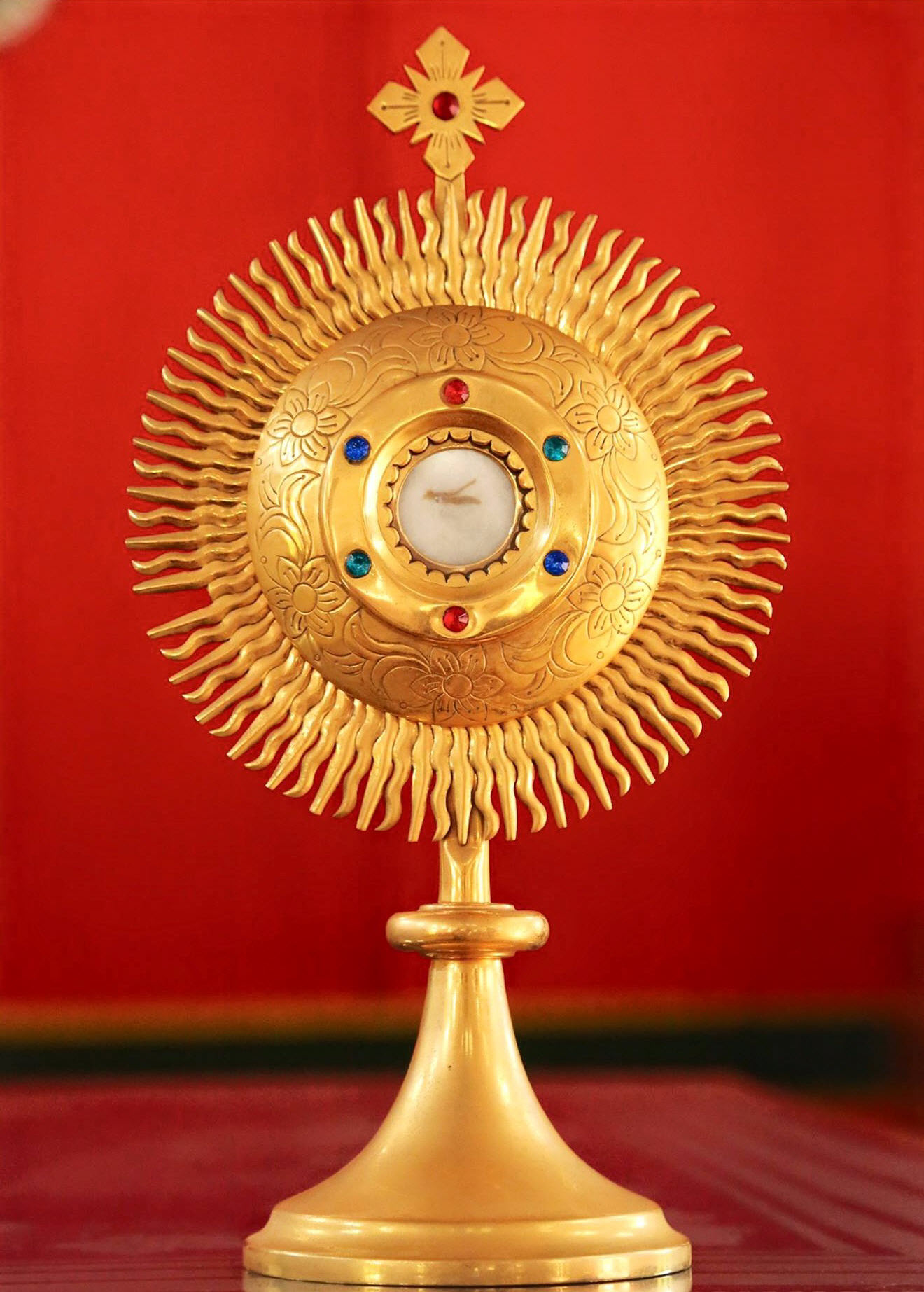
Soonoro in E.A.E St. Mary's Church Meenangadi, Wayanad

Saint Thomas kept the holy belt with him. After he died as a martyr in Mylapore, his and relics have been kept in India. In 394 AD, the holy girdle moved from India to Şanlıurfa on 22 August 705. and established in Saint Mary Church of the Holy Belt. This church is also known as the Church of Holy Girdle or The Church of the Lady of the Girdle. Some manuscripts and a Garshunian book containing stories and speeches were sent by the people of Homs in 1852. The Archbishop of Homs ordered the renovation of the church. On 20 July 1953 A.D, The Holy Girdle was discovered at the Altar of the church by Patriarch Ignatius Aphrem I Barsoum in the presence of Alexandros, the Greek Orthodox bishop of Homs, Syria. This girdle is considered to be one of the most important relic in Syriac Orthodox Church.

=== Relics of Patriarch Ignatius Elias III ===
Saint Ignatius Elias III (died 13 February 1932) was the 119th Syriac Orthodox Patriarch of Antioch from 1917 to 1932 who arrived in Malankara and spend his last days there, and is buried at the monastery of Manjinikkara Dayara in Kerala, India, which is now a site of pilgrimage for Syriac Orthodox Christians. The church at Meenangadi also holds the sacred relics of Ignatius Elias III.

== Historical visits to the church ==
=== Apostolic Visits of Patriarch of Antioch ===
Year	Patriarch
1982	Ignatius Zakka I Iwas, Patriarch of Antioch & All East.
2024	Ignatius Aphrem II, Patriarch of Antioch & All East.

=== Maphrians ===
Baselios Paulose II, the second Catholicos/Maphrian of the Malankara Jacobite Syrian Orthodox Church.
Baselios Thomas I, Catholicos/Maphrian of the Malankara Jacobite Syriac Orthodox Church.

=== Patriarchal Delegates and Metropolitans ===
Mor Yulios Elias Qoro, Third Patriarchal Delegate to Malankara.
Mor Athanasius Paulose (Kadavil II)(Metropolitan of E.A.E Arch Diocese)
Geevarghese Mor Gregorios Perumbalil (Perumbally Thirumeni)
Mor Clemis Abraham, 'Great Metropolitan of the East' of Knanaya Diocese.
Mor Philoxenos Shamuel Metropolitan of Malabar Diocese.
Mor Polycarpose Geevarghese (Metropolitan of E.A.E Arch Diocese)
Yuhanon Mor Philoxenos Valiya Thirumeni, Bishop Emeritus of Malabar Diocese

=== Clergy ===
'Malphono Naseeho' Athunkal Geevarghese Corepiscopa (First Vicar & Founder of the Church)
'Malankara Malpan' Kurien Kaniamparambil Corepiscopa
Fr. Philip Pallichira Kathanar (Ass. Vicar of Church During 1958)
Fr. Boniface Kathanar, Manglore (Ass. Vicar of Church During 1958)
Fr. P.K Mathews Pazhamadam (Ass. Vicar of Church During 1958)
Fr. T. C. Alexander Alexander Corepiscopa

== Sub-organisations ==
- Mor Basil Chapel, Mepperikunnu
- St. Mary's Sunday School under M.J.S.S.A (Malankara Jacobite Syrian Sunday School Association)
- Mor Ignatius Youth Association
- Mor Baselios Paulose II Charitable Trust
- St. Mary's Women's League

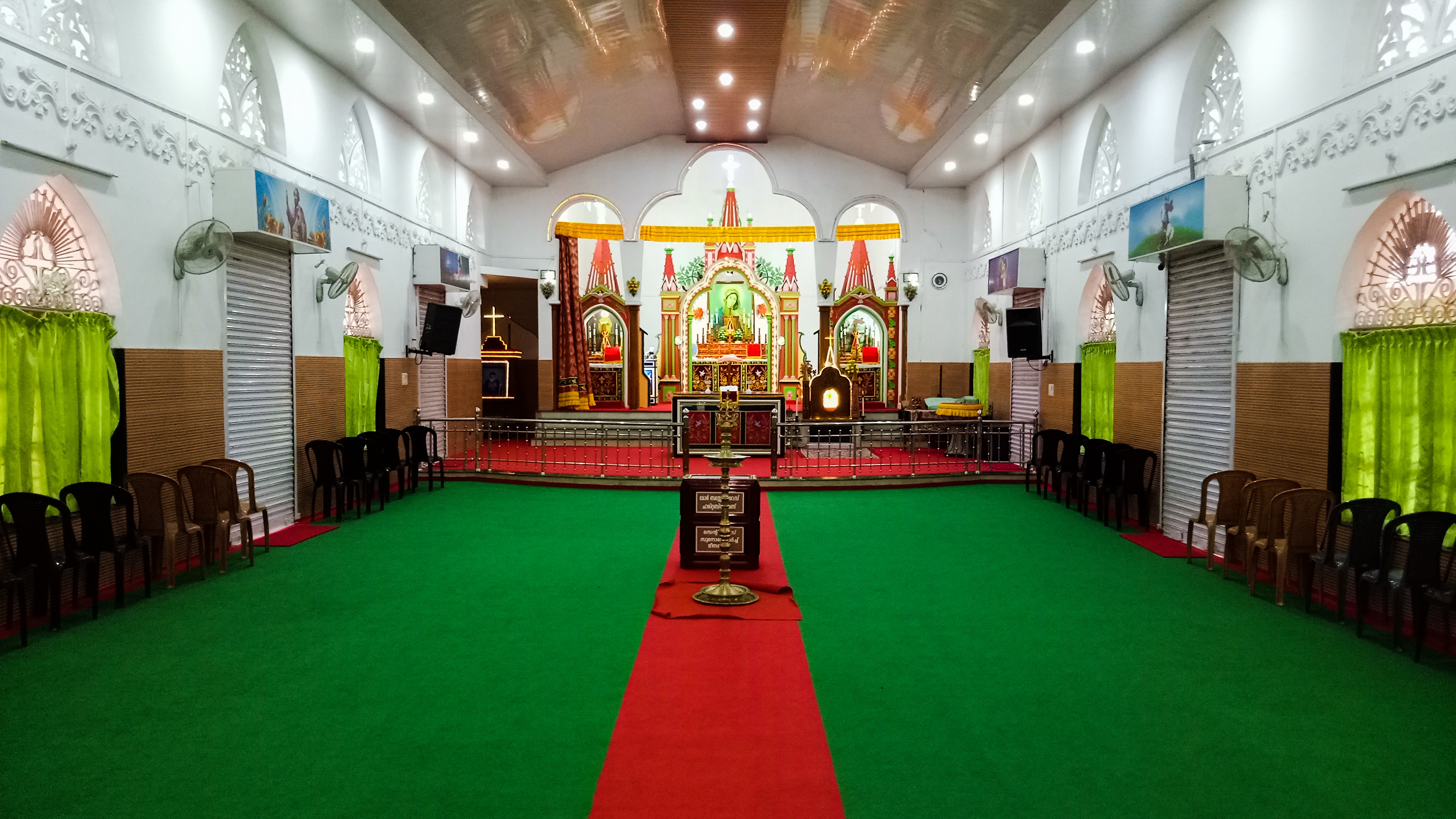
The building's interior

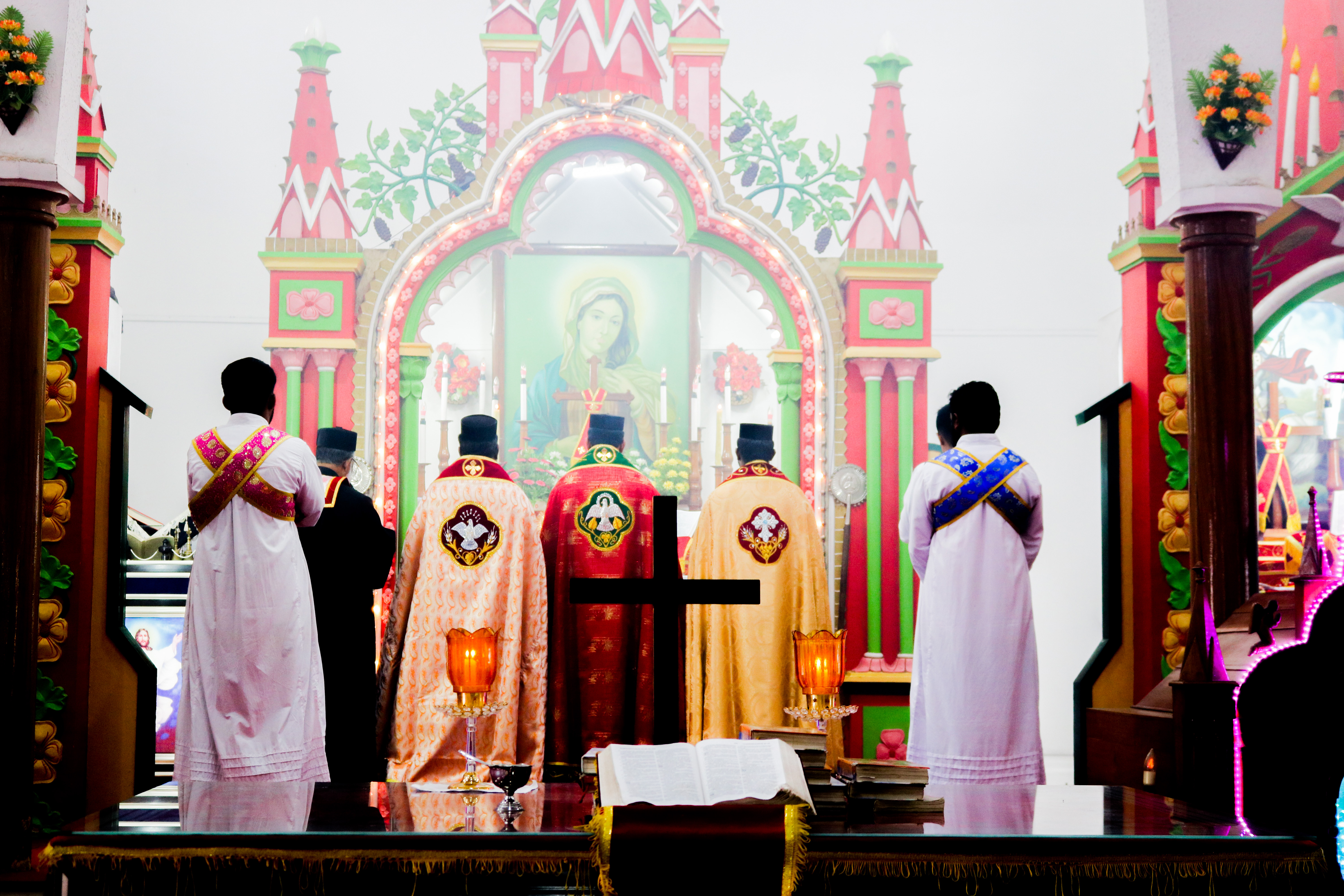
Eucharist at St. Mary's Church, Meenangadi

== Daughter parish ==
E.A.E Mar Behnam Malankara Jacobite Syriac Orthodox Church Kallinkara – Cheeral
