= Manarcaud =

Manarcad മണർകാട് Manarcadu
- Town
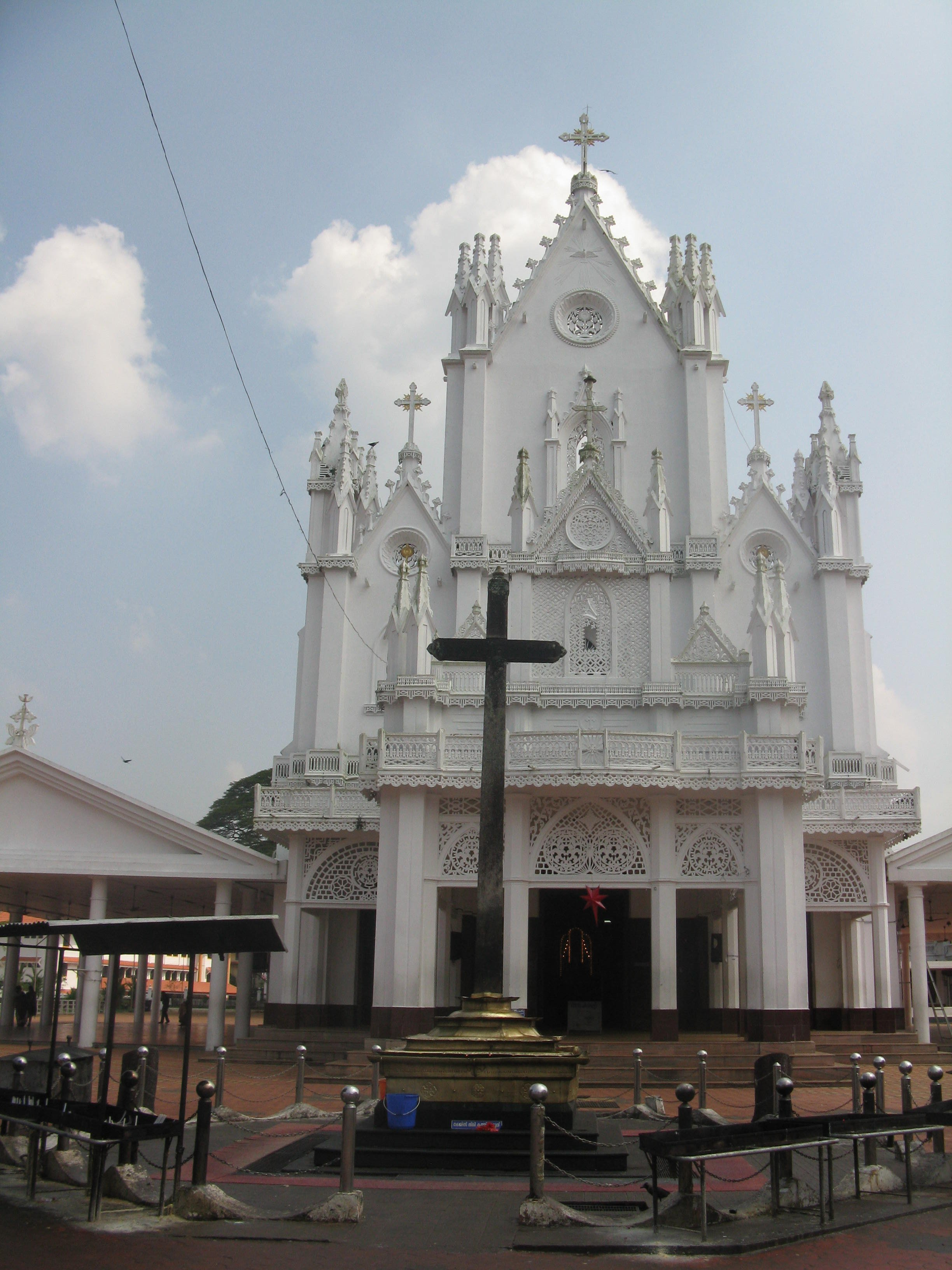
- Manarcad Church
- Interactive map of Manarcad
- Coordinates: 9°36′45″N 76°35′0″E
- Country: India
- State: Kerala
- District: Kottayam

Population (2009)
  - Total: 40 053

Languages
  - Official: Malayalam, English
- Time zone: UTC+5:30 (IST)
- PIN: 686019
- Telephone code: +91 481-XXXXXXX
- Vehicle registration: KL-05
- Nearest city: Kottayam
- Literacy: 90%
- Lok Sabha constituency: Kottayam
- Assembly Constituency: a
- Climate: Moderate (Köppen)

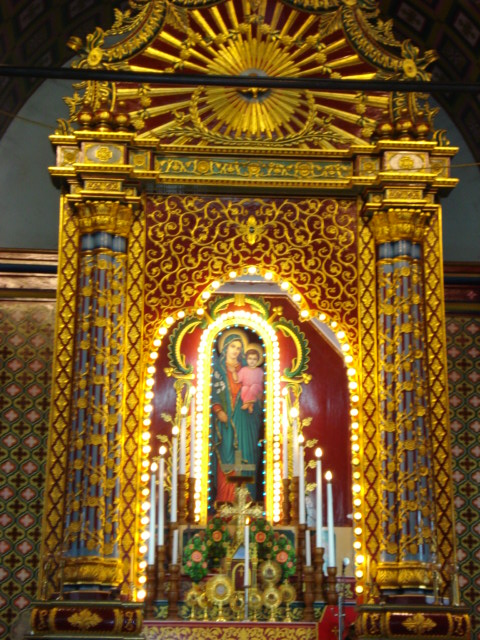
The icon of the blessed Virgin Mary at the St.Mary's Church, Manarcad

Manarcad (pronounced Ma - nar- cad) is a small town in Kottayam district of Kerala state, South India. It is known for the Manarcad Perunnal, the annual feast at the St. Mary's Church, which is usually held from September 1–8 (during the 8-Day Lent). It is located about 9 km from the town of Kottayam and is on the way to the tourist town of Thekkady.

== People ==
The majority of the population depend on agriculture, but recently there is not much agricultural land. Manarcad has now become a suburb of the Kottayam town, and a good residential area.

Manarcad is one of the most densely populated villages in Kerala. The Rasa (a type of religious procession) during the feast of the St. Mary's Church here, which is held in September of every year is known as one of the biggest Rasas in Asia. Manarcad Temple festival is in the month of January and April (Pathamudayam) every year.

== Culture ==
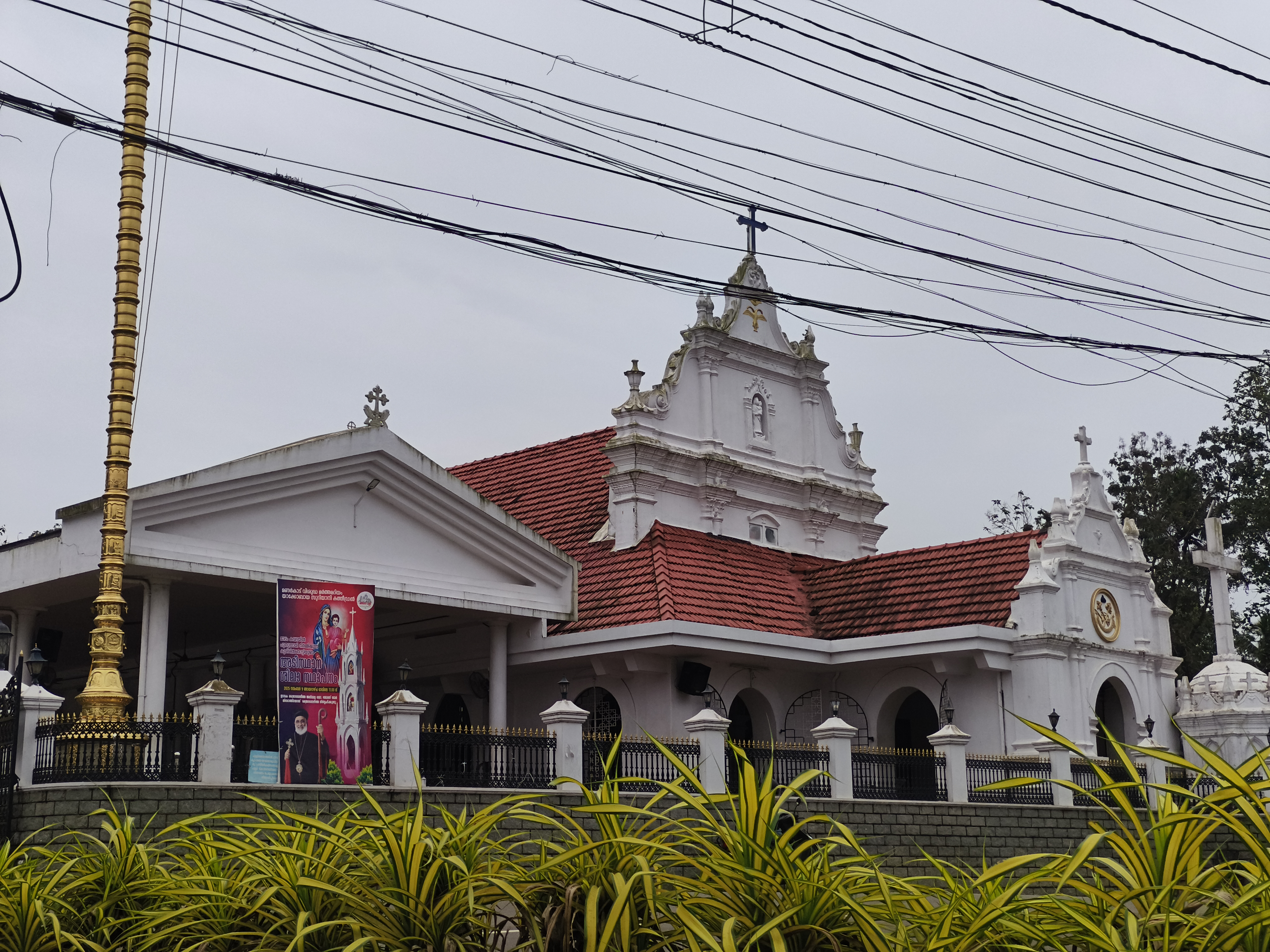
St. George Jacobite Syrian Church belongs to St. Mary's Jacobite Pilgrim Church, Manarcad.

Manarcad church has been declared as a pilgrimage center of the Jacobite Syriac Orthodox Church.

Majority of its population is Christian, belonging to the Jacobite Syrian Orthodox, Malankara Orthodox Syrian Church, Marthoma, Pentecostal and Brethren communities. Main Churches are Manarcad St.Mary's Jacobite Church, Vadakamanoor Orthodox Church, Church of God Gilgal Maalam and Brethren Assembly Maalam.

== Economy ==
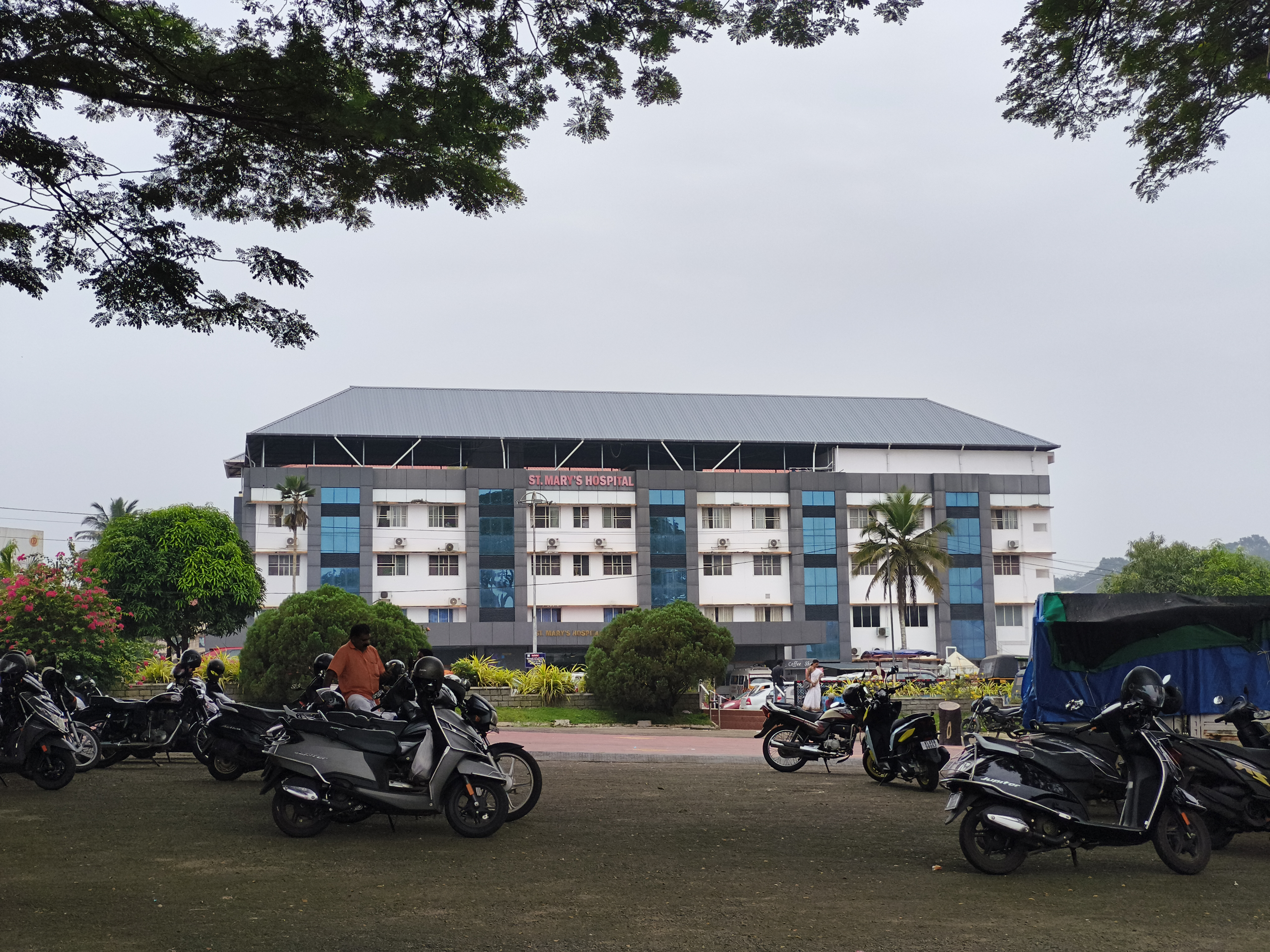
St. Mary's Hospital, Manarcad

Nowadays, NRIs (Non Resident Indians) act as the financial backbone for this small urban village.

== Agriculture ==
Rubber, pineapple, pepper and coconut plantations contribute to the agricultural income. A few paddy fields remain unaltered.

== Media ==
Kolo Suryoyo is a publication by St Mary's youth association, Manarcad. It is a popular Christian Magazine. Margadeepthi magazine is also published from Manarcad.

Hospital Ministry of India Manarcadu Cell published Neeravu.

== Main attractions ==
Manarcad St. Mary's Church, Manarcad Devi Temple, Vijayapuram Srikrishna Temple Vennimala, Paalamuri bridge and Nalumanikatu (a roadside recreational park near Manarcaud).

== Festivals ==
Main festivals in this area are Manarcad palli perunnal (the Ettu Nombu at Manarcad church). Pathamudayam (a ten-day festivity at Bhagavathi temple), Nadathurakkal (Manarcad church), Pattukalam Koodicha (a 41-day festival at Bhagavathi temple), Kumbha Bharani (a one-day festival at Bhagavathi temple) and Meena Bharani (a one-day festival at bhagavathi temple), procession during Sreekrishna Jayanthi at vijayapuram sreekrishna swamy temple. The bhagavathi temple is believed to be older than 2000 years. People from all religions take part in church and temple events with harmony.

Other attractions is a procession (Rasa) in the Manarcad St. Mary's church, which is considered to be one of the longest and heavily packed Rasas in Asia. On the seventh day of the feast, a very old icon of the Virgin Mary is unveiled in a ceremony known as Nadathurakkal.

Masayogam held in Church Of God Gilgal Bhavan Maalam is a festival of Pentecost communities.

Another attraction in this town is 'Naalumanikaatu' on the Manarcadu-Ettumanoor Bypass. The word 'Naalumanikaatu' means evening breeze. In the evening, many people in this town spend some time at this place.

Ammaveedu (literally, "Mother's house") a charitable organisation very near St. Mary's church, is an organization for aged and sick people who are lonely in life.

== Schools ==
- St. Mary's English Medium School
- St Mary's Higher Secondary school
- St. Mary's College, Manarcad
- St Mary's I T C
- St Mary's Hospital
- St Mary's School Of nursing
- Infant Jesus Bethany Academy
- Govt. UPS Manarcad
- Govt. UPS Maalam

== Transportation ==
Buses provide the main public transportation and are available 24/7. The nearest railway station is the Kottayam railway station (about 8 km away). More than 200 other buses operate in this route.

== Getting there ==
| By road | Kottayam-Kumali |
| By rail | Kottayam Railway Station |
| By air | Cochin International Airport |

== Nearby places ==
Nearby places include Maalam, Oravackal, Areeparambu, Ayarkunnam, Pampady, Puthuppally, Panikkamattom, 6th Mile, Palamuri, Kuzhippurayidom, Vadavathoor, Thiruvanchoor, and Amayannor.

== Sports and games ==
Manarcad has its own sports history. There is a variety of football Naadan panthukali in which they use a small leather ball the size of a cricket ball. This game has five innings, and normally it will take three hours to get finished.

== See also ==
- St. Mary's Jacobite Syrian Cathedral, Manarcad
