= Irenious Paulose =

Syriac Orthodox bishop

His Grace Mor Irenious Paulose Metropolitan of Kozhikode Diocese and Patriarchal Vicar of Oman
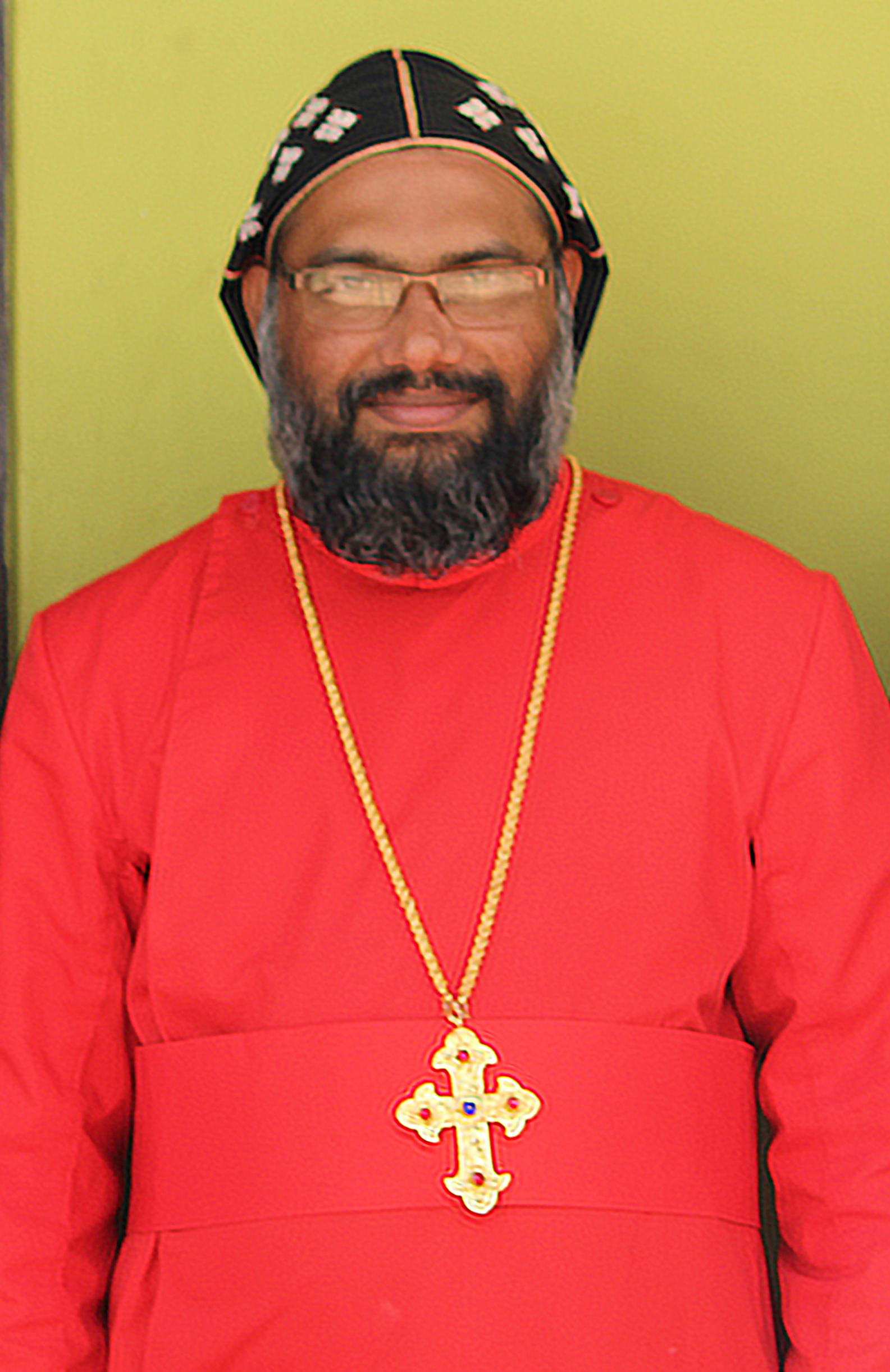
- Church: Jacobite Syrian Orthodox Church
- Diocese: Kozhikode Diocese and Patriarchal Vicar of Muscat
- See: Holy Apostolic See of Antioch & All East

Orders
- Ordination: 15 May 1998 (Kassisso) by Mor Polycarpus Geevarghese
- Consecration: 24 August 2008 by Patriarch Ignatius Zakka I
- Rank: Metropolitan

Personal details
- Born: August 24, 1972 Mangalore
- Parents: Mr.Varkey Abraham Vettikkunnel and Mrs.Saramma
- Education: B.A from Karnataka University, M.A Sociology from Mysore University, Diploma in Theology from Manjinikkara Dayro & M.S.O.T. Seminary, B.D from Serampore University, Kolkata, M.Th. from Serampore University, Kolkata

Mor Irenious Paulose is a Syriac Orthodox bishop, currently Metropolitan of Kozhikode Diocese and Patriarchal Vicar of Muscat. His parish was St. Antony's Cathedral Church in Jeppu, Mangalore under Honnavar Mission of Syriac Orthodox Church.

== Education ==
Paulose Mor Irenious got his bachelor's degree from the Karnataka University and master's degree in Sociology from Mysore University. Later he studied Diploma in Theology from Manjinikkara Dayro & M.S.O.T. Seminary, Mulanthuruthy. After his Diploma he further studied at Kolkata and has B.D. followed by M.Th. Degree from Serampore University.
