= Polycarpus Geevarghese =

Mor Polycarpose Geevarghese Metropolitan
- Metropolitan of E.A.E Arch Diocese and Honnavar Mission
- Church: Jacobite Syrian Christian Church
- Diocese: E.A.E Arch Diocese and Honnavar Mission
- See: Syriac Orthodox Patriarchate of Antioch
- In office: 1957—2011
- Predecessor: Mor Athanasius Paulose II Metropolitan
- Successor: Mor Chrysostomos Markose Anthonios Yaqu'b

Orders
- Ordination: 1956, (Kooroyo) by Mor Mor Yulios Elias Qoro
- Consecration: 27 May 1990 by Patriarch Ignatius Zakka I
- Rank: Senior Metropolitan of E.A.E Arch Diocese & Honnavar Mission

Personal details
- Born: 5 April 1933
- Died: 6 March 2011 (aged 77)
- Buried: St. Anthony's Jacobite Syrian Cathedral, Mangalore, Karnataka
- Residence: Nadayil House, Chennithala, Mavelikkara, Pathanamthitta Dt, Kerala
- Education: BA (Hons), Mangalore University, Theological Studies, Malecruz Dayro, Puthencruz, Kerala

Mor Polycarpus Geevarghese (1933–2011) was the Metropolitan of Evangelistic Association Of The East and Honnavar Mission of Jacobite Syrian Orthodox Church.

== Early life ==
Mor Polycarpus was born on April 5, 1933, to Mr. Mathew Philipose and Mrs. Eliyamma of Nadayil Mulanilkkunnathil Famil, Chennithala, Pathanamthitta District, Kerala. St. George Jacobite Syrian Church, Chennithala was his home parish. He attended Eramathoor Ilavumood Primary School and NSS High School in Mannar. He completed SSLC in 1950, but decided to devote his life to the church rather than going on to study civil engineering.

== Ordination ==
He was ordained as a Korooyo, or deacon, in the year 1956, then as Kassisso in 1957 at Manjanikkara Dayaro. He began his service in the Kozhichal and Kottamala parishes in Kasarkod district, also serving as vicar at St. Mary's Church Meenangadi in Kerala, St Mary's Church Athyadi in Karnataka and various other churches in region

== Metropolitan ==
On May 27, 1990, George Cor Episcopo was ordained as the Metropolitan of EAE and conferred the name Mor Polycarpus Geevarghese by Mor Ignatius Zakka I Iwas. The additional charge of Honnavar Mission was also given to Mor Polycarpus. Established various charity and social services and visited the South Canara Region (including Mangalore). Thereafter new priests were ordained and regular Sunday services were started in almost all the churches under the EAE and Honnavar Mission.
