= Anthonios Yaqub =

21st-century Syriac Orthodox bishop

His Grace Mor Anthonios Yaqub
- Metropolitan of Mangalore, and Director of the Honnavar Mission
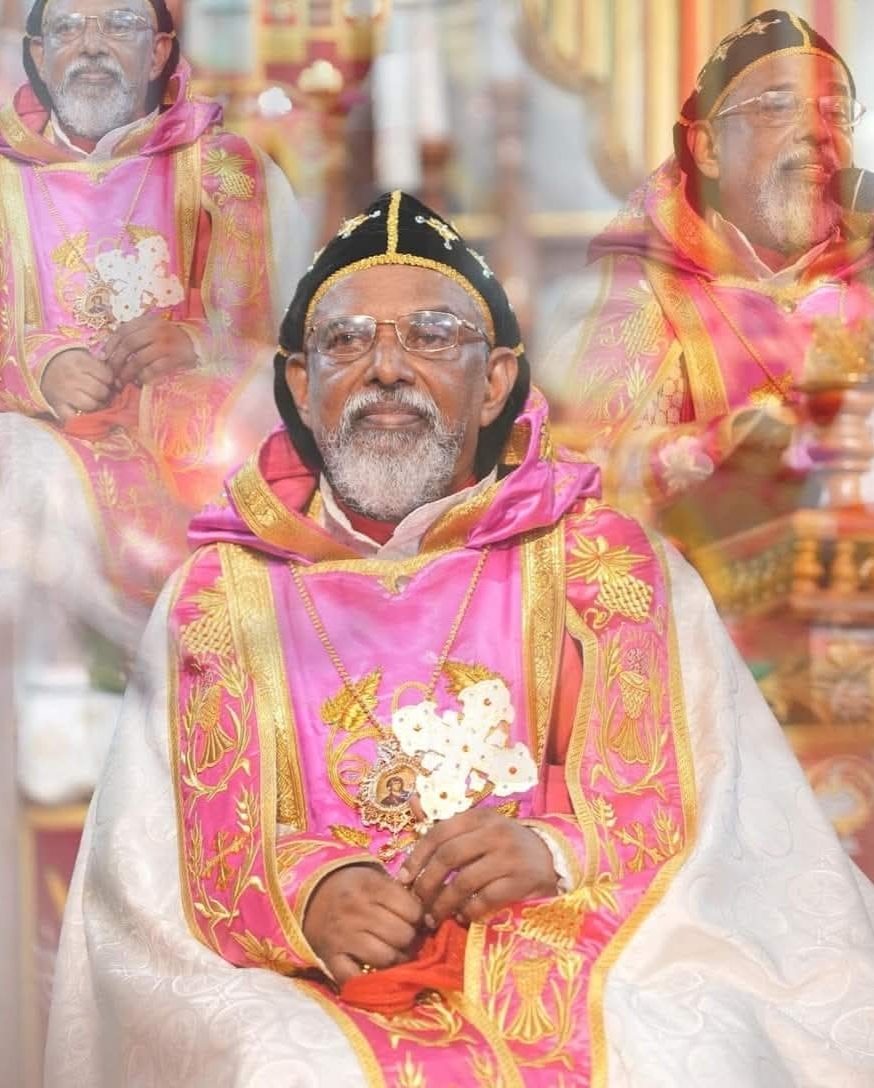
- Church: Syrian Orthodox Church
- Archdiocese: Mangalore
- Diocese: Manglore Diocese, Honnavar Mission
- See: Syriac Orthodox Patriarchate of Antioch and All the East
- In office: 2009 — present
- Predecessor: Geevarghese Mor Polycarpus
- Successor: incumbent
- Previous post(s): None

Orders
- Consecration: 23 August 2009 by Patriarch Ignatius Zakka I

Personal details
- Born: 1952; Piravom, Kerala

Mor Anthonios Yaqub (born 12 July 1952) is a Syriac Orthodox bishop of Honnavar Mission and Metropolitan of the Mangalore Diocese.

== Early years ==
Mor Anthonios Yaqub was born on 12 July 1952 as the fourth son of K.C John and his wife Eliyamma John, Plamthottathil House, in the small village of Kalamboor near Piravom in Ernakulam District, Kerala. His father (ancestors family) was member of St. George's Jacobite Syrian Church, Kalamboor (Kandanad Diocese). His mother was from the Maliekal family, Pravom (sister of Maliekal Vaidyan) - were members of St. Mary's Valiyapally Piravom ( Kandanad Diocese). His mother was the granddaughter of the sister of Saint Paulose Mor Koorilos (Panampady Thiumeni) and also close relatives of Thomas Mor Osthatheos, (Pachilakkattu) Metropolitan. In 1959, his parents along with the relatives migrated to Kullanki Village in Baindur Taluk, Udupi, Karnataka. His family along with 7 other Jacobite families took the initiative to build a new church at Athyadi, which has turned up to 100 families.

Yaqu'b Mor Anthonios had his primary Education at the Baindur Govt. School and Honnavar Mission School and Pre-University from Bhandarkars College Kundapur. During 1975-1979 he completed his Seminary Course from the Malecruz Dayro, Puthencruz, Kerala and Syriac studies under Joseph Sir, Paulose Mor Athanasius Metropolitan (Kadavil Thirumeni II), Yakob Mor Themothios Metropolitan (Thrikkothamangalam), R. V Markose, and Skariya Cor-Episcopa.

== Priesthood ==
On 3 February 1977 Thomas Mor Osthatheos Metropolitan (his maternal uncle) ordained young Jacob a Korooyo at Malecruz Dayro Church, and he was ordained as ‘Samsono’ (full deacon) on 23 February 1979 by Catholicose Aboon Mor Baselios Paulose II, at Moovattupuzha Catholicate Cathedral. On 11 May 1979, the Catholicose Aboon ordained him a Kassisso (priest), at St. Mary's Jacobite Syriac Orthodox Soonoro Church, Athyadi ( Home Parish), Karnataka. In the meanwhile he acquired M.A Sociology from Mysore University. He got ordained as Cor-Episcopo on 18 February 2003 by Geevargese Mor Polycarpus Metropolitan, at the St. Mary's Soonoro Jacobite Syrian Church, Renjilady and was since then known as Very Rev. P. J. Jacob Cor Episcopa.

Yaqu'b Mor Anthonios served as the Manager of St. Antony's Mission & Educational Society from 1996 to 1999 and from 2002. He also served as manager of St. George's PUC College, Nellyady, St. Antony's, Udane, Jeppu St. Antony's, Honnavar Higher Elementary School, Davengere Higher Primary school and the Director of St. Antony's Orphanage, Honnavar, Brahmavar, Melegre's church, Snehalaya old-age Home, Brahmavar Afa-Omega Retreat Centre. He was Managing Committee member of the Evangelistic Association of the East for a long time.

He served as vicar in the St. Peter's & Paul's Church in Shirady, St. Mary's Soonoro Church in Renjilady, St. Thomas Church in Nelliady, St. George's Church in Shibaje, St. Simmon's Church in Ichilampady, St.Mary’s Church in Kunthoor, Karnataka under the Evangelistic Association of the East and St. Antony's Church in Jeppu, Mangalore, St. Milagre's Church in Brahmavar, St. George's Church in Madhyody, St. Antony's Church in Honnavar and his home parish St. Mary's Jacobite Syriac Orthodox Soonoro Church in Athyadi under Honnavar Mission.

On 20 August 2009, Jacob Cor Episcopa was ordained a Raban (monk) by Mor Philoxinos Mattiyas Nayis, the Patriarchal Assistant, assisted by Mor Dionnasios Behanam Jajavi, Joseph Mor Gregorios (Metropolitan of Diocese of Kochi and secretary to the Holy Episcopal Synod in Malankara) and Mor Yulios Kuriakose (Metropolitan of Simhasana Churches &and institutions in Malankara). Final consummation service of ordination was blessed by the Patriarch.

On 23 August 2009 in a ceremony held at the St. Peter's & St. Paul's Cathedral in the Monastery of St. Aphrem the Syrian, Ma`rrat Sayyidnaya, Damascus, Ignatius Zakka I Iwas, the supreme head of the Universal Syrian Orthodox Church, ordained Yaq'ub Ramban from India to Auxiliary Metropolitan, by name Mor Anthonios Yaqu'b, for the St. Antony's Mission in Honnavar under the Syriac Orthodox Patriarchate of Antioch and All the East, in the presence of many religious dignitaries and others.

== Current responsibilities ==
Yaqu'b Mor Anthonios on ordination was given the responsibility of St. Antony's Mission, Honnavar. Since the formation of Mangalore diocese in 2011 as per the decision of the Malankara Synod, he held full charge of the new diocese.
