= St. Mary's Jacobite Syrian Cathedral, Manarcad =

Manarcad Church
- St. Mary's Cathedral, Manarcad
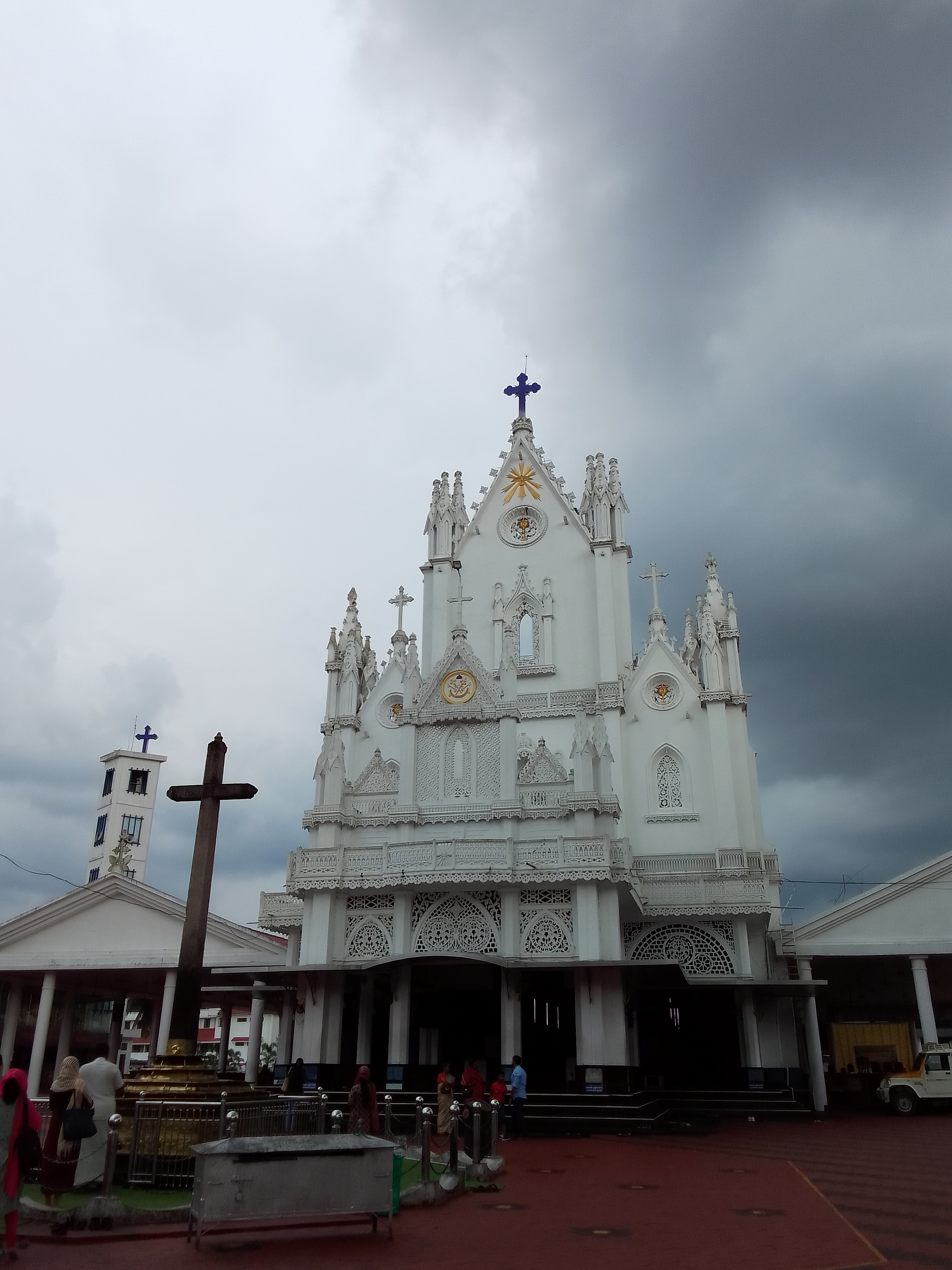
- Morth Maryam Cathedral, Manarcad

- Location in Kerala, India
- 9°35′59″N 76°35′4″E
- Location: Manarcaud, Kottayam district, Kerala
- Country: India
- Denomination: Syriac Orthodox Church
- Website: manarcadpally.com

History
- Dedication: St. Mary

St. Mary's Syrian orthodox Cathedral, Manarcad, is cathedral located in Manarcad, about 9 km from the town of Kottayam in Kerala, India. It is a destination for people on annual pilgrimages for the uncanonical 8 Day Lent of the Virgin Mary. There are more than 5000 families in this parish. The church architecture resembles that of the Orvieto Cathedral. The church administers various spiritual organisations, schools and a hospital. It is the home to one of the holiest relics among the 1064 Malankara churches, a small piece of Mother Mary's belt, called the Holy Soonoro.

== Church history ==
The inscription on the stones in the Haikalah of the church is in an ancient script-nanum monum, written about 600 years ago. The church was constructed in the 16th century, in a Portuguese fashion. The construction of the present church was completed in 1954.

The desire of Christians in the area for a holy place to conduct prayers and religious ceremonies were the root cause of the construction of the church. They started praying for this purpose. On the 8th day of their prayer, the ancestors had a vision to build a church in the forest where a cow and calf were lying down, where fish and deer could be caught and Acacia Instia trees and canes were scattered around. They went in search of the cow and calf and found them where the church is presently situated.

The old Manarcad Church was built before the 10th century. To build a church in those days was a near impossible task. Ancestors were well aware of the difficulties ahead. The land where the church is constructed belonged to the Devaswam. Edathil Tampuran, the Hindu chieftain there, opposed the plan to build a church. The King, who depended on Edathil family's private army in times of war, would not go against him. The odds were against the church.

Ancestors knew that Thekkumkur kings were traditionally very secular. Moreover, the king had a soft spot for them and the full backing of the Christian community there. They decided to meet the king with his request. After a lot of deliberation, the king finally decided in favor of the ancestors, not wanting to disappoint him. Sixty-one 'Pathalpadu' (a unit of area used for land measurement in those days) land was staked out for the church around the spot where the cow and calf were found.

Edathil Thampuran continued to nurse his grudge against ancestors for bypassing him and getting the approval of the King. He incited his men to destroy the church. The church was pulled down thrice and thrice it was rebuilt. Having spent almost all of his entire wealth on the church, the ancestors found it hard to continue the construction anymore. The Kallakkadampil family came to their help and with their financial assistance, the Manarcad Church was finally completed.

The church was later renovated, and the construction of the present church was completed in 1954.

The inscription on the stones in the Haikalah of the church in the ancient script nanum monum (Vattezhuthu) show that they were inscribed in between about A.D. 910 and A.D. 920. The royal swords are also kept in the church, which are believed to be given to the church by the king for the protection of church parishes.

During the year 700 of Malayalam Era (Kollavarsham) the then ruling King of Vadakkumkoor had a discontent with the Christians. It was a period of great torment for Christians and the king showed hostility to the Christians and their possessions, including Manarcad church which bordered the neighboring kingdom, Thekkumkoor. The then king of Thekkumkoor maintained a special relationship with Christians and had even given the swords to the church for its protection.

== Feasts ==
- 15 January – A feast invoking the blessings of the Virgin Mary on agricultural seeds.
- 26 February – Sunero Feast.
- 6 May – Commemoration of St. George.
- 15 August - Virgin Mary's Ascension Day
- 8 September - 8 Day Lent, Feast of the Virgin Mary's birth; millions attend the annual 8-day lent and celebration, known as Ettunombu Perunnal, during which an image of Christ and the Virgin Mary is unveiled in a ceremony called "Nadathurakkal".

== The small church (കരോട്ടെ പള്ളി) and the chapels (കുരിശുപള്ളി) ==
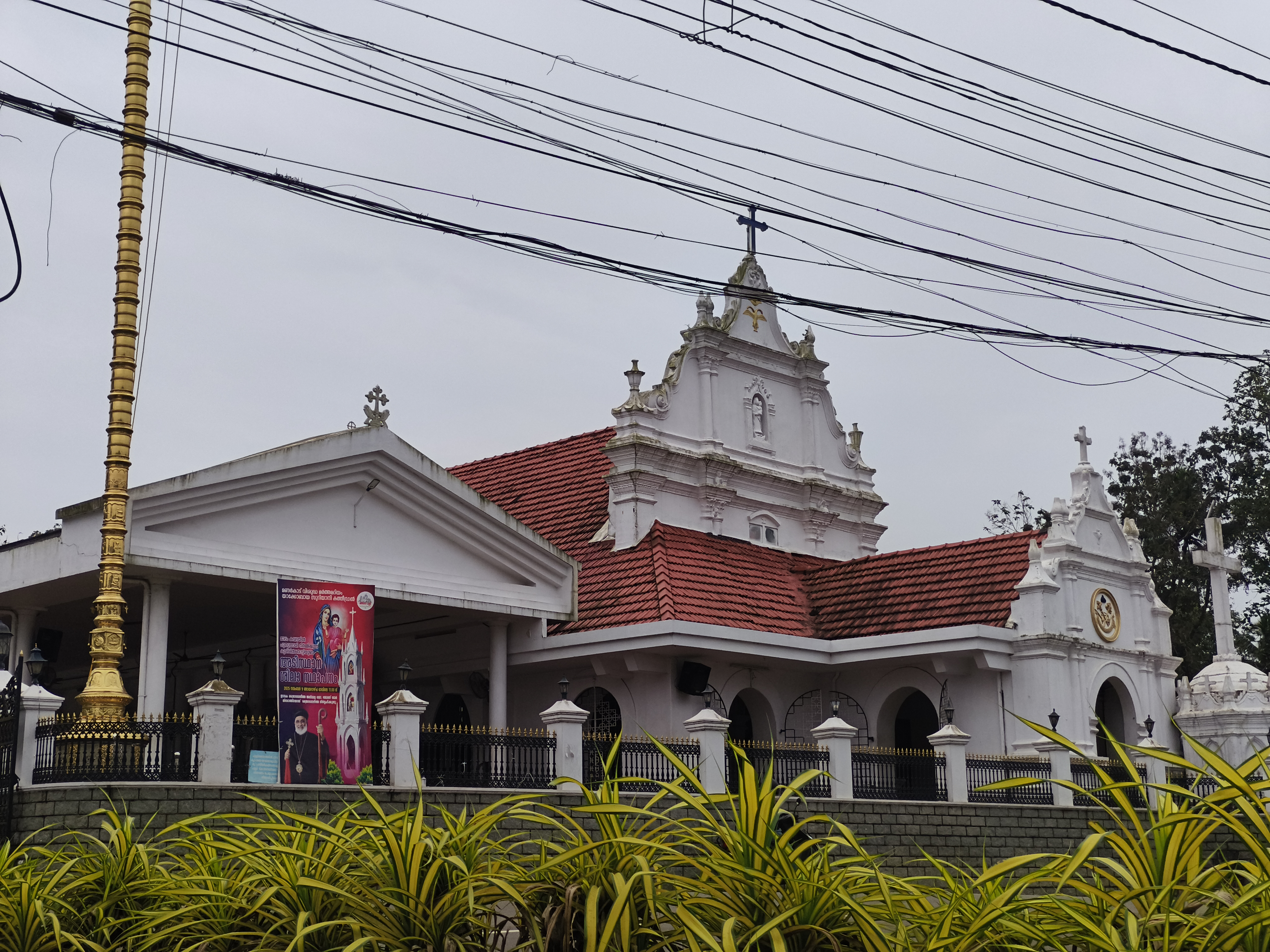
St. George Jacobite Syrian Church(കരോട്ടെ പള്ളി) belongs to St. Mary's Pilgrim Church, Manarcad.

The small Church was built just opposite the main church on the main road in late 19th century. The area for building this small church was given by Vettikunnel family.

Eight kilometers east of Kottayam town, on K.K. Road, at Manarcad Junction, lies a chapel of the Church. The church and all church establishments are all only around 11 kilometres (6.8 mi) north of this chapel. There is another chapel set up half a kilometer west of the churchyard at Kottayam.

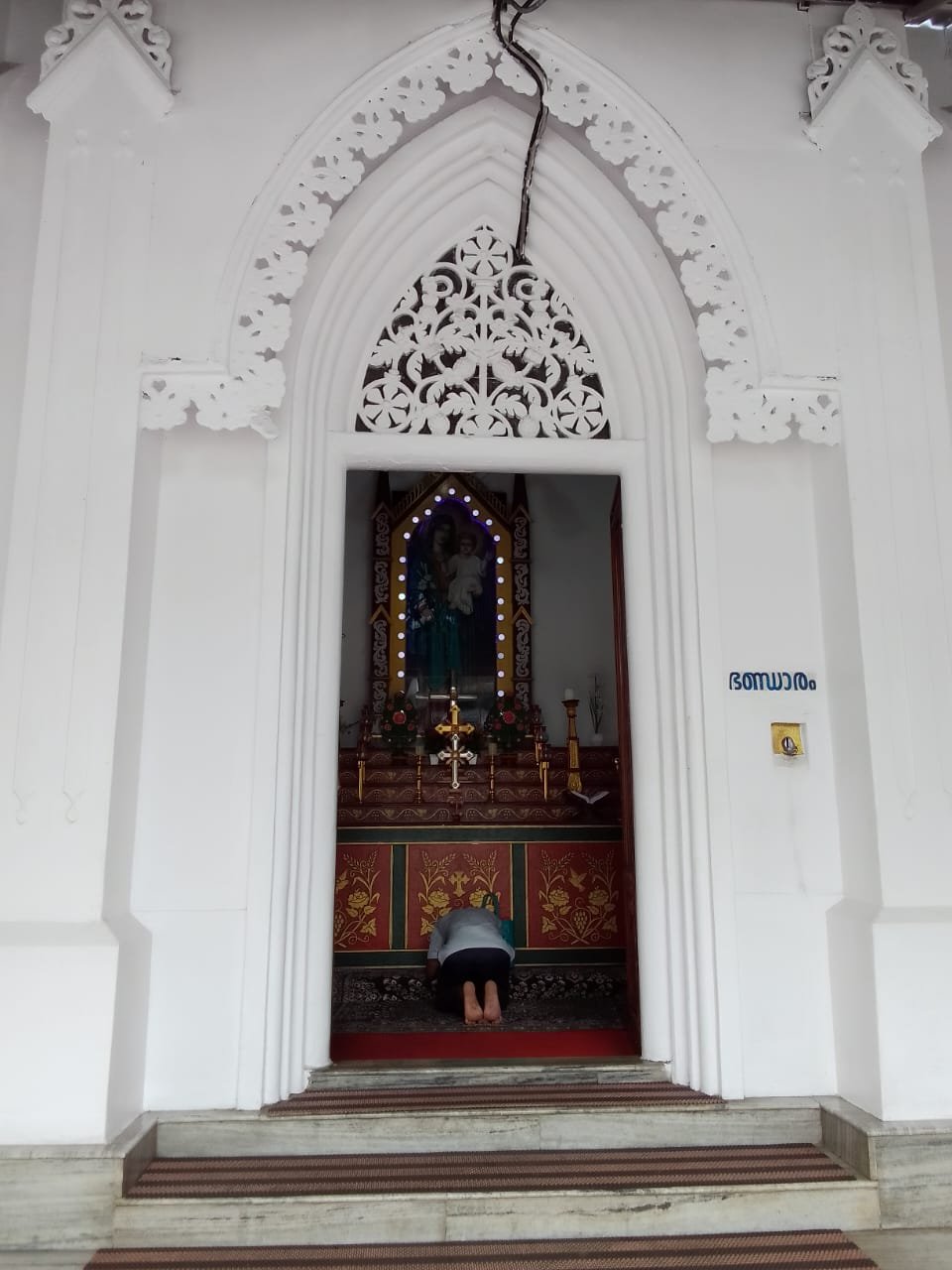
Manarcad Jacobite Syrian Church Shrine of Manarcad Junction

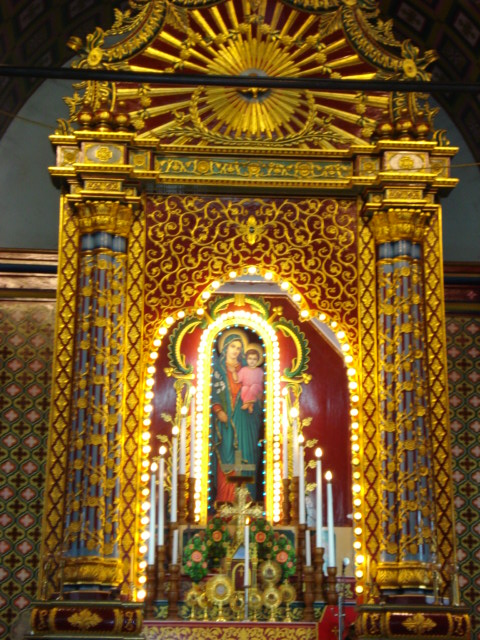
The icon of the blessed Virgin Mary at the St.Mary's Jacobite Syrian Church, Manarcad

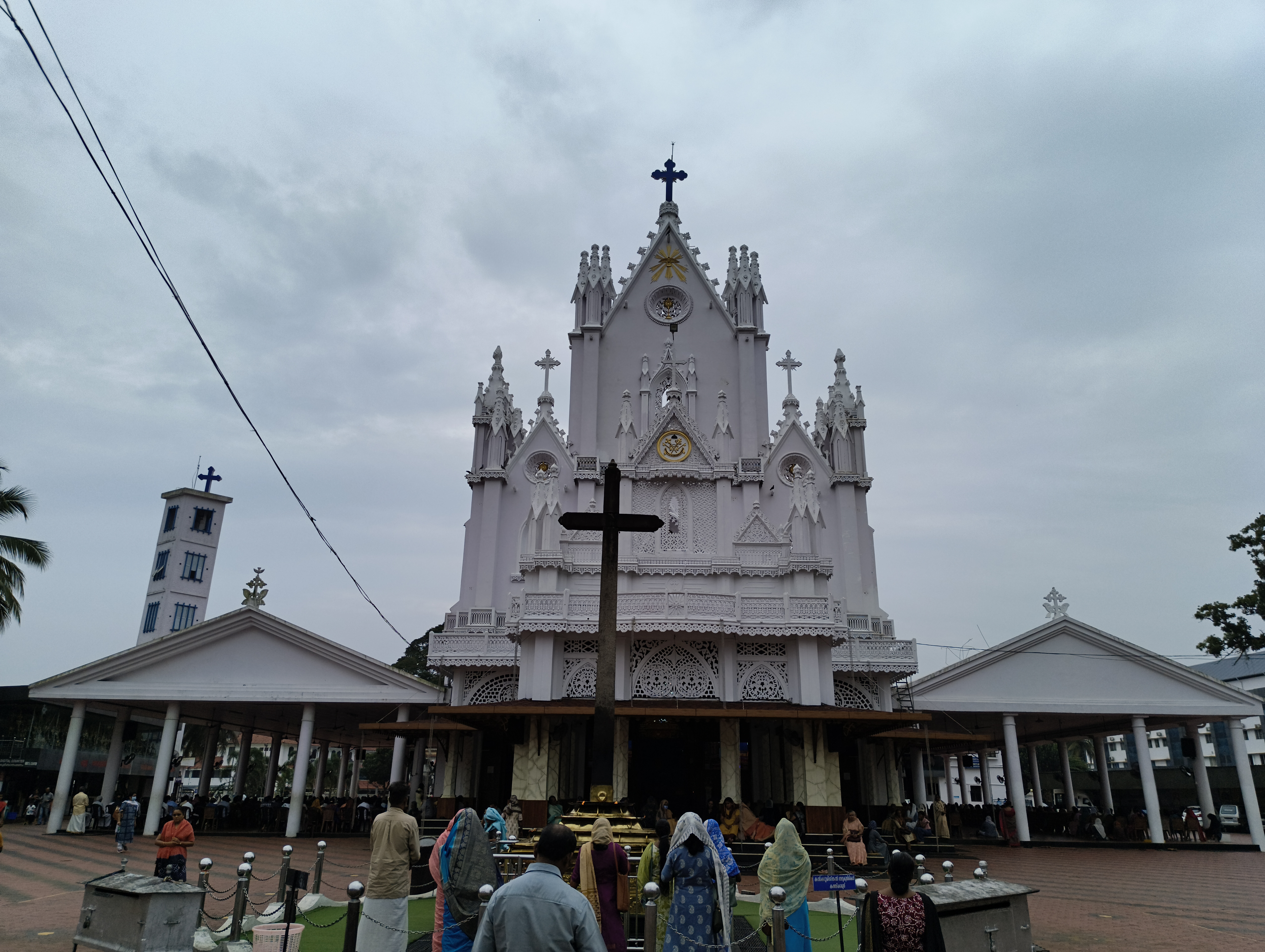
Front view of the church

== Schools and hospitals ==
- St. Mary's CBSE School, Manarcad (established 1993)
- St. Mary's Higher Secondary School (established 1949)
- St. Mary's IT College (established 1978)
- St. Mary's Nursing School (established 1976)
- St. Mary's College (established 1981)
- St Mary's Hospital

== Spiritual organizations ==
=== Sunday school ===
The first Sunday school of the church was established in 1926 and there are now 16 such schools under this parish. They inculcate Christian faith, develop spiritual culture and develop latent leadership qualities of children. More than 963 children learn spiritual lessons from 233 instructors at these Sunday schools, which jointly participate in Vacation Bible Schools (VBSs), teachers' seminars and Christmas carols.

=== Vanitha Samajam ===
They function with the aim of enabling ladies to attain spiritual enlightenment and nobility of mind. The members visit patients, pray for their recovery and extend financial help to poor patients. Members visit those who are in distress and sorrow and alleviate their suffering by offering them spiritual advice. 18 units of this organization functions in the parish.

=== Youth Association ===
St. Marys Youth Association, a spiritual organization of youngsters of St. Mary's Cathedral Manarcad is one among the biggest youth association of the Malankara Jacobite Syrian Church. Kolo Suryoyo, the monthly newsletter of this organization shares the happenings of the cathedral to the community. The Youth Association takes lead in organizing various charity activities such as financial assistance to cancer patients, dialysis kits for patients with kidney diseases and educational assistance to needy students. As a part of 'Pachathuruthu', a campaign for an ecofriendly parish, the youth association honors the best farmer of the Cathedral. Christmas celebration of the Cathedral organized by the Youth Association is well attended by the general public. A mobile application developed by Youth Association is also available in the Google Play Store as 'Manarcad pally'.

=== Elders' forum ===
It is constituted of elders of over 60 years of age. This body discusses spiritual matters, assesses the functioning of various religious bodies and lays guidelines in the matter.

=== Hail Mary League ===
It is a spiritual and cultural body that aims to spiritually uplifting young girls.

=== Prayer meetings ===
The prayer meetings are conducted based on the ancient instructions of this parish. The prayer groups that used to engage in the past have grown into organized prayer meetings. They function fervently in different parts of this parish.
