= Athanasius Paulose II =

Dr. Mor Athanasius Paulose Metropolitan
- Dr.Mor Athanasius Paulose Kadavil II Metropolitan
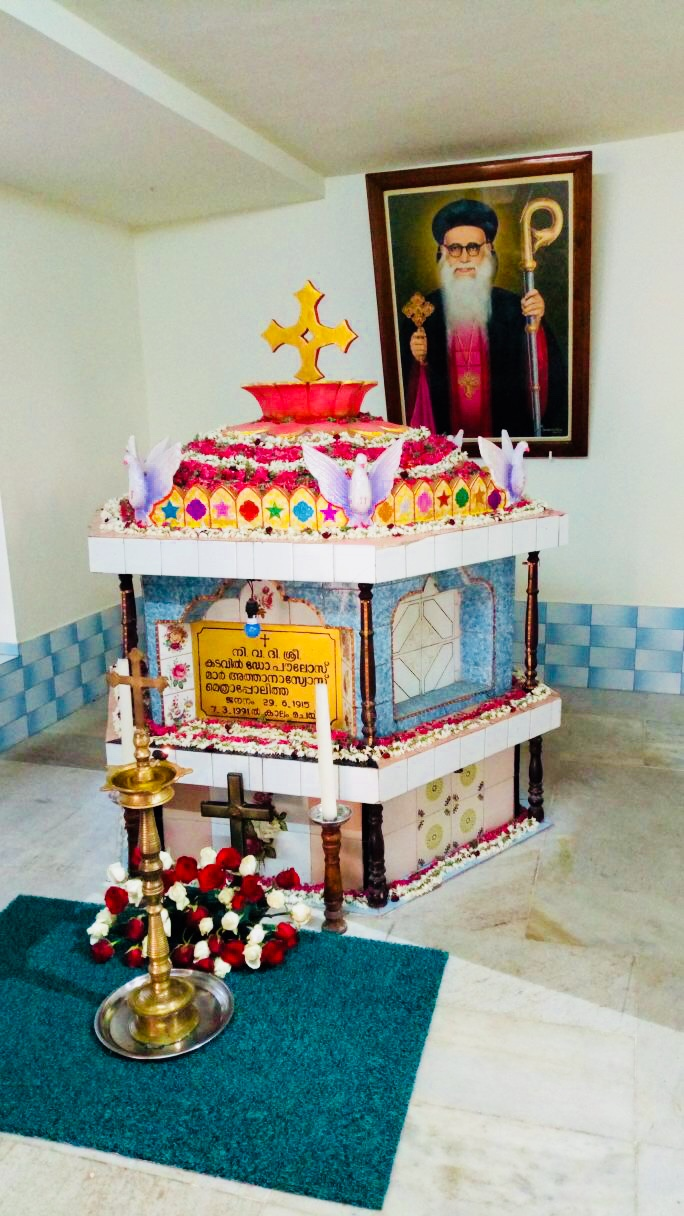
- Tomb of Mor Athanasius Paulose Kadavil II Metropolitan
- Church: Jacobite Syrian Christian Church
- Diocese: E.A.E Arch Diocese
- See: Syriac Orthodox Patriarchate of Antioch
- In office: 1947-1985
- Retired: 1986
- Successor: Mor Polycarpose Geevarghese

Orders
- Ordination: 1938, ( Kooroyo ) by Mor Mor Yulios Elias Qoro
- Consecration: 1973 September 01 by Ignatius Jacob III
- Rank: First Metropolitan of E.A.E Arch Diocese

Personal details
- Born: June 29, 1915 North Paravur
- Died: March 7, 1991 (aged 75)
- Buried: Mor Ignatius Jacobite Syrian Church Cheria Vappalasserry; 10°10′16″N 76°22′26″E
- Denomination: Orthodox Christian
- Education: M.A from Madras University M.A from Columbia University; Ph.D - Kerala University in Church History; D.D- from Sweden D.Lit- from Sweden

Athanasius Paulose (27 June 1915 – 7 March 1991) was the First Metropolitan of Evangelistic Association of the East. He was consecrated as Metropolitan in 1973.

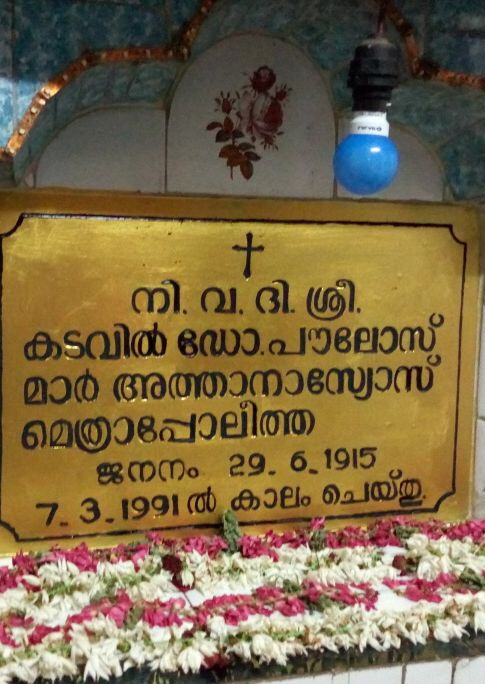
Inscription on the Tomb of Mor Athanasius Paulose II

== Early life ==
Paulose was born to Kunjannam and Kadavil Kurien Paulose (the son of Varkey, elder brother of Kadavil Paulose Mar Athanasius, the first metropolitan of Angamali diocese). His early education came in North Paravur.

Paulose went to UC College Aluva followed by postgraduate studies in philosophy at Madras Christian College in 1941. He earned a degree in political science from Columbia University US in 1950 and a doctorate from Kerala University in 1966. In Sweden he received D. D. & D.Litt. degrees in 1974. He was well versed in Syriac.

== Career ==
In 1938, Paulose was ordained by Mor Mor Yulios Elias Qoro, the delegate of the Apostolic See of Antioch to Malankara. In 1944, Athanasius Paulose (Valiyathirumeni) ordained him as Qashisho. Mor Yulios elevated him to the rank of Raban on Chingam 24 1947. He served as a teacher at Thrikunnath Seminary. Raban Paulose was consecrated by late Patriarch Mor Ignatius Yac'ub III on 2 September 1973. He was given the title Athanasius like his ancestor.

He wrote classical books in English and Malayalam. He spoke Arabic, Bengali and French. His books included, Bible & India, Ennathe Vidhyarthikal, Randu Vrudhanmmar, Acharya Sahai, Shushrushka Sahai, Four Jacobite Liturgies, Meaning and Interpretation of the Eucharist of the Syrian Church, The Orthodox Syrian Church: Its Religion and Philosophy (Ph.D. Thesis), Five Years in the Central Jail and Sheema Yatra Njan Kanda India, England and America. He also translated the prayers and Qurbono Thakso from Syriac rendered the Qurbono songs from Syriac tunes into English.

== Later life ==
In 1985 he relinquished his duties to lead a life of prayer and rest. He was entombed at St. Ignatius Jacobite Syrian Church, Cheriya Vappalasery.
