= Ettu Nombu =

Remembrance of Mother Mary

8 Day Lent
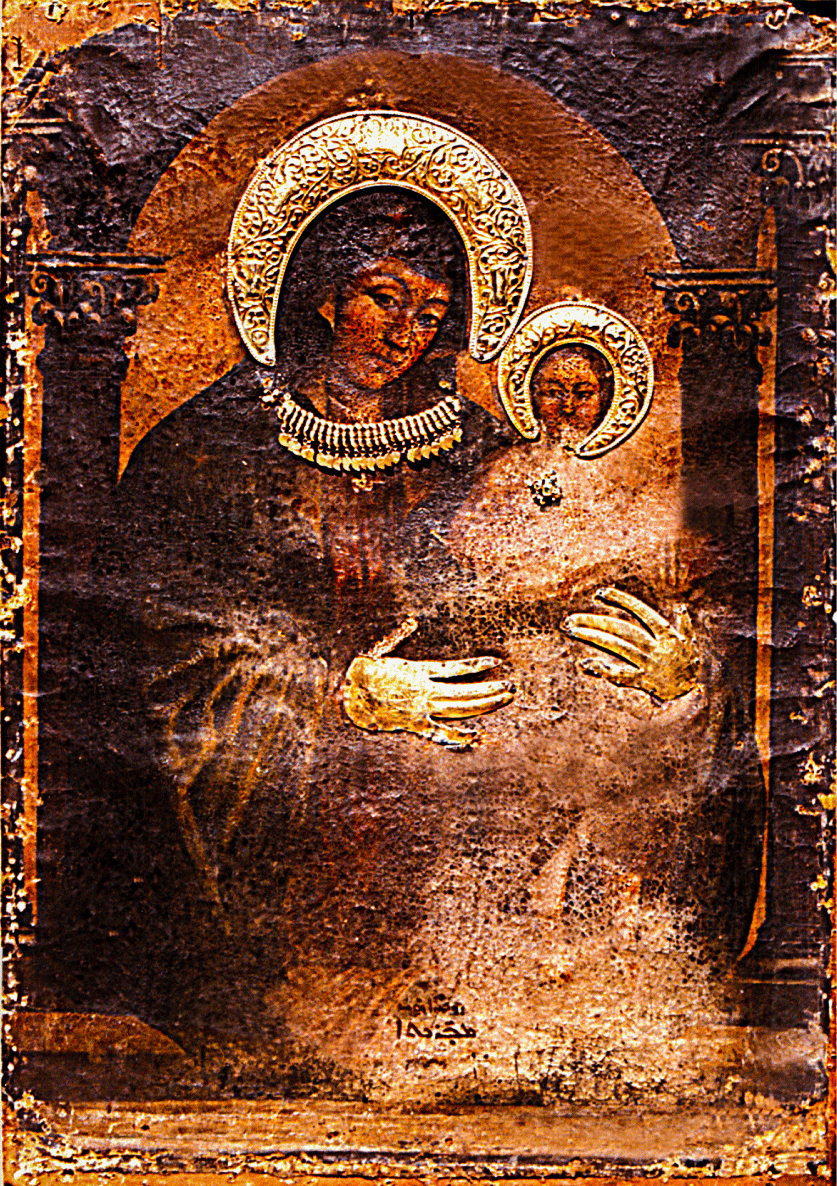
- Icon of the Virgin Mary.
- Also called: Ettu Nombu
- Begins: 1 September
- Ends: 8 September
- Duration: 8 days
- Frequency: Annual

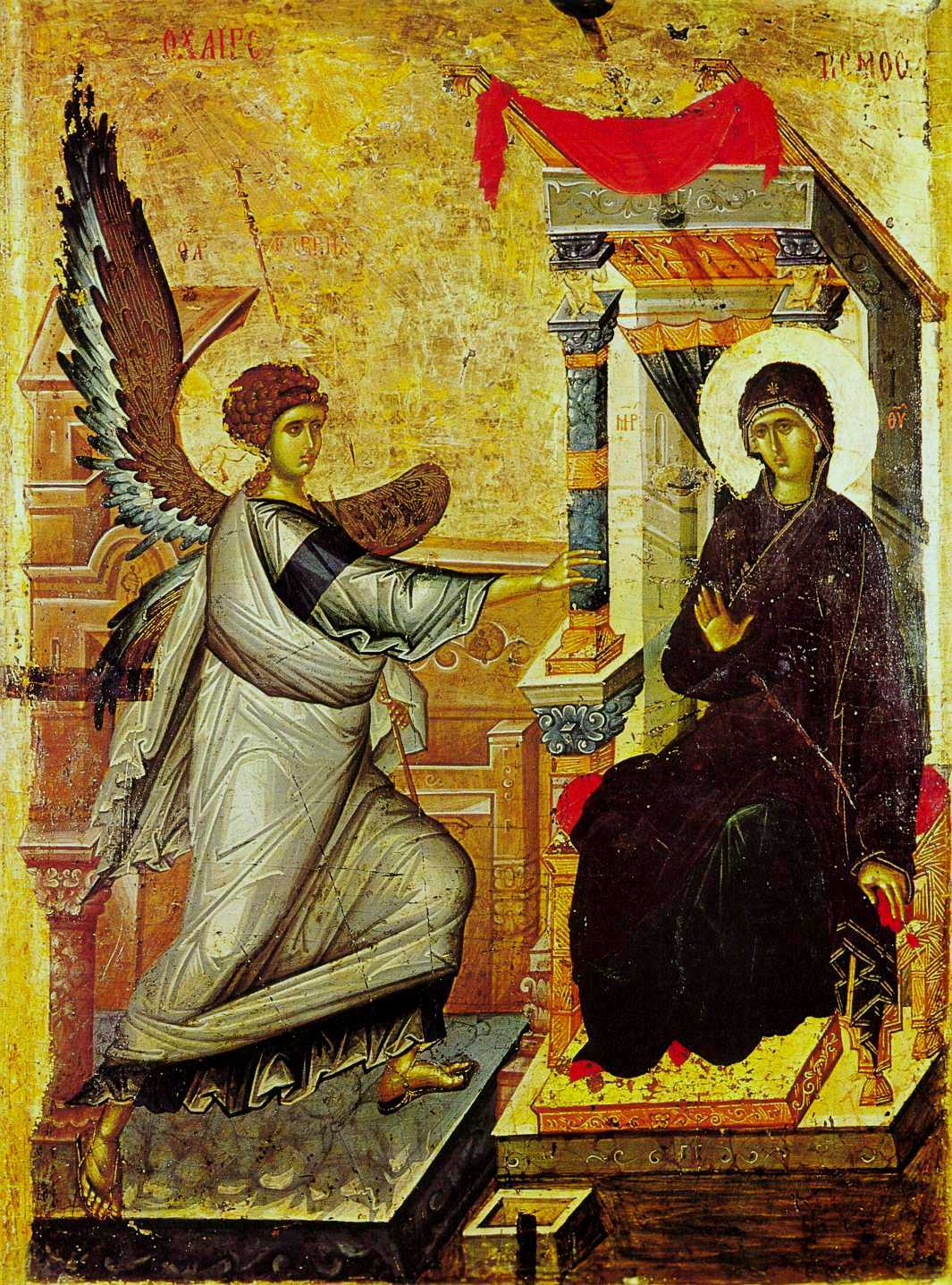
'The icon of Annunciation'

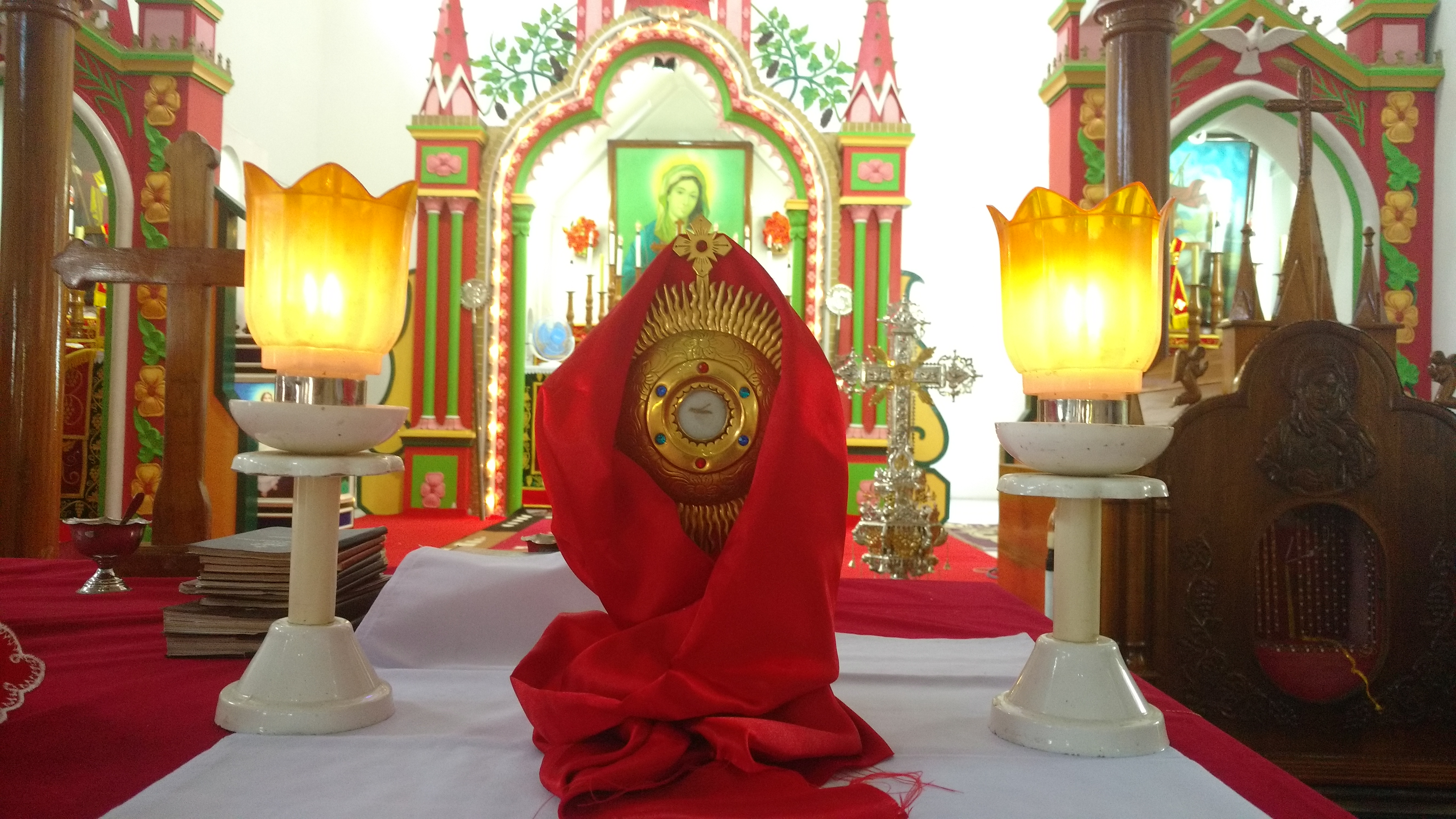
Holy Girdle of St Mary

Ettu Nombu (Malayalam: എട്ടു നോമ്പ്) or the Eight Day Lent of St Mary, is a solemn remembrance of virgin-mother of Jesus Christ, for the St Thomas Christians in Kerala, India.

The custom is observed in the Eastern Catholic (Syro-Malabar Catholic and Syro Malankara Catholic) and Oriental Orthodox (Jacobite and Indian Orthodox) churches in Kerala. Believers participate in fasting and praying for the eight days. During this time churches celebrate the feast in remembrance of the birth of St Mary (Nativity of Mary) and the eight days of lent is rigorously observed from the 1st day to 8th day of September with charitable activities, evangelical conventions and special prayers to honor St Mary. For Syrian Catholics (Syro-Malabar Catholic and Syro Malankara Catholic), praying the rosary in groups is an important custom during these days. The eight days of lent is not a canonical one for the Church but is observed by the Syrian Christians of India and also of the Near Eastern countries.

== Origin stories ==
It appears that this practice originated in connection with the Islamic invasion and the subsequent fall of Kodungallur, a Christian centre in Kerala. There are different versions about the origin of the lent.

=== The narration by Bar Ebroyo ===
In the seventh century, there was a town called Heera near Basra, which was predominantly a Christian township. The Caliph of Baghdad captured this town and appointed a fanatic Muslim governor, who implemented the caliph's every dictum with fervor. The caliph was known to be cruel and had a weakness for beautiful women. He was enamored by the beauty and charm of the women of Heera and decided to reach there in three days. The chastity and modesty of the women of Heera were at stake. They sought refuge in the church of St. Mary. The priest declared an uncompromising lent for three days invoking the intercession of mother Mary. On the 3rd day, in the middle of the Holy Qurbana, a golden beam of light flashed down from above, then spread to illuminate the whole church. It is said that the priest had a vision of Mother Mary and also heard her saying, “Do not be afraid; peace be to you – Rejoice. The Caliph is no more. Tribulations are over”. The priest then turned to the people and they could see an aura around the priests face as he relayed the message. The whole congregation praised the Lord and thanked Mary for her intercessory prayers.

The women then decided to observe a lent for eight days (i.e. from the 1st to the 8th of September in commemoration of this event). They believed that Mother Mary helped safeguard their chastity, modesty and dignity.

=== Establishment at Kerala ===
By the 3rd century St. David (an Episcoppa) came to India from Basra and evangelized people. This was followed by the Knanaya Migration from Şanlıurfa in the 4th century. Iraqi migrants of the 8th century further spread this tradition. As it is not a canonical event of the Church calendar its popularity is somewhat limited. St. Mary's Cathedral, Manarcaud, under the jurisdiction of the Malankara Jacobite Syrian Orthodox Church, is believed to be the first church to have reestablished the lent in a wide manner. It remains the largest church where the 8-Day lent is a popular tradition. The stone inscriptions found at the church reveal that the church was built more than a thousand years ago. Archeologists have found out that these stone inscriptions were memorial stones set up at the tombs in 910 A.D. and 920 A.D. The writing on them are in Malayalam and Tamil scripts prevalent 600 years ago. St. Mary's Church, Meenangadi is the first church to adopt the 8 day lent in the Malabar region. Many churches in the name of St. Mary have subsequently begun recognition of the 8 day lent. The Holy Girdle is taken out for the public at the eighth day.
