= The Evangelistic Association of the East =

Non-governmental organization

Evangelistic Association Of the East
- The Evangelistic Association Of the East
- പൗരസ്ത്യ സുവിശേഷ സമാജം

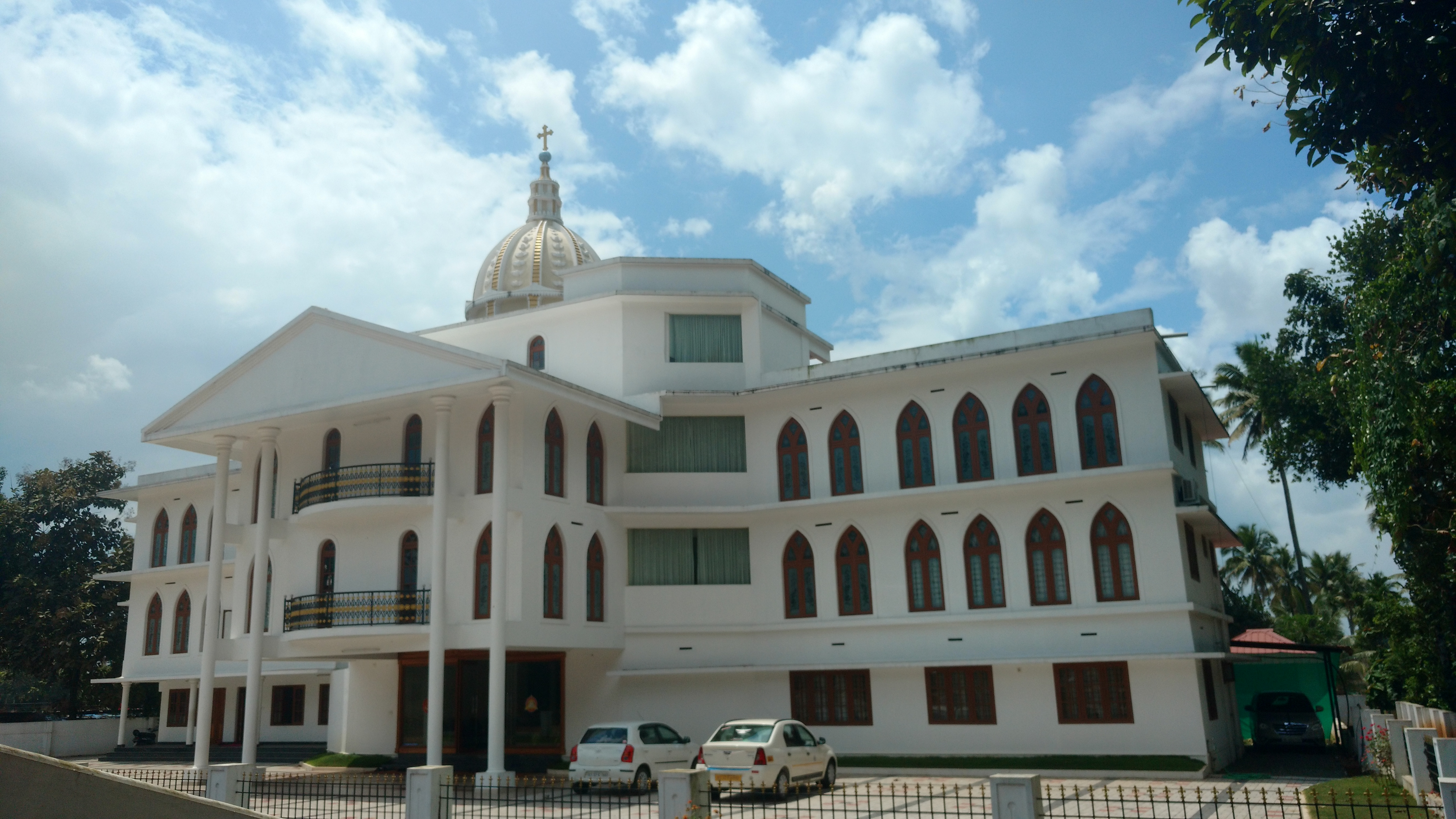
- The EAE Head Office at Perumbavoor
- Abbreviation: EAE
- Formation: November 5, 1924; 101 years ago
- Founder: 'Malphono Nasiho' Geevarghese Corepiscopa Athunkal
- Type: Registered Societies (Non-Government)
- Registration no.: S.8/1949
- Legal status: Non-profit organization
- Headquarters: Iringole (Post), Perumbavoor, Ernakulam District, Kerala
- Coordinates: 10°7′1.8516″N 76°29′34.8648″E
- Region served: Kerala, Karnataka
- Services: Education, Social Work, Gospel Team
- General Secretary: Geevarghese Vellappakuzhy
- Patron: Moran Mor Ignatius Aphrem II Patriarch
- President: Mor Chrysostomos Markose Metropolitan
- Vice President: Poulose Cor-Episcopo Parekkara
- Publication: Pourastya Suvisheeshakan Magazine, E.A.E Diocesan Voice Newsletter
- Affiliations: Syriac Orthodox Church of Antioch
- Website: www.eae1924.org

The Evangelistic Association of the East is a registered non-governmental organization headquartered at Perumbavoor, Kerala working in the educational, social service and spirituality sectors. The organization consists of educational institutions, orphanages, and an archdiocese affiliated with Syriac Orthodox Church across South India. It was founded as the first missionary association of Syriac Orthodox Church in 1924 by 'Malphono Nasiho' Geevarghese Cor-Episcopa Athunkal(1902-1997) and later registered in 1949 under Indian Societies Registration Act. XXI of 1860. The E.A.E Arch Diocese is under the direct control of Ignatius Aphrem II, patriarch օf the Syriac Orthodox Church․

== Educational institutions ==
=== Kerala ===
- Mar Stephen Vocational Higher Secondary School, Valakom, Kunnackal P.O. Muvattupuzha.
- St. Thomas Higher Secondary School, Kelakom P.O. Thalassery, Kannur.
- P. E. M. High School Thiruvanchoor P.O Kottayam Dist.
- Uppukandom A.G.C.M.U.P. School, Airoorpadam P.O. Thrikkariyoor, Kothamangalam. Ernakulam Dist.
- Emmanuvel Upper Primary School, Kayanadu P.O. Muvattupuzha. Ernakulam Dist.
- St. Mary's Lower Primary School, Plamudy P.O. Kothamangalam, Ernakulam Dist.
- Santhom Public School, Thungali, Vengoor P.O. Perumbavoor, Ernakulam Dist.

=== Karnataka ===
- St. George Pre-University College, Nelliyady. P.O., South Kanara, Karnataka State. St. George High School, Nelliyady. P.O., South Kanara, Karnataka State.
- St. George English Medium High School, Nellyady, South Kanara, Karnataka.
- St. George U.P.School, N. R. Pura P.O, Chikmagalur, Karnataka.

== EAE Archdiocese of the Syriac Orthodox Church ==
Evangelistic Association of the East Archdiocese of the Syriac Orthodox Church

Location
- Country: India
- Jurisdiction: Evangelistic Association of the East
- Zones: Kochi-Travancore, Malabar, Kasaragod, N.R Pura, South Canara

Leadership
- Patriarch: Ignatius Aphrem II
- Catholicos: Baselios Joseph
- Archbishop: Chrysostomos Markose

History
- Established: 1973
- First Hierarch: Athanasius Paulose II

Information
- Denomination: Oriental Orthodox
- Church: Syriac Orthodox Church
- Affiliation: Malankara Syriac Orthodox Church
- Rite: West Syriac Rite
- Calendar: Gregorian Calendar
- Cathedral: St. George’s Cathedral, N.R. Pura
- Monastery: Mount Tabor, St.Thomas Monastery, Chooramudy

Statistics
- Monasteries: 1
- Parishes: 30
- Chapels: 16
- Priests: 36

Website
- https://eae1924.org/eae-archdiocese/

This archdiocese mainly consists of churches in Kerala and Karnataka. St. Thomas Church

Malankarakunnu was the oldest church in Wayanad, Kerala, and was of E.A.E Archdiocese, but now under Malabar diocese.

=== Kerala ===
==== Kochi-Travancore Zone ====
1. St. Thomas Edessa Church Nedungapra, Perumbavoor
2. St. George’s Emmanuel Church Peruva, Karikkode, Kottayam
3. St. George's Church Anakkal, Malampuzha, Palakkad
4. St. George's Church Sharonkunnu, Pothanikkad, Kothamangalam, Ernakulam
5. St. Mary's Church Kattikkayam, Thodupuzha, Idukki
6. St. Mary's Church, Thodupuzha

==== Malabar Zone ====
1. St. George’s Church, Aralam, Kannur
2. St. Mary’s Soonoro Syriac Orthodox Pilgrim Church Meenangadi, Wayanad
3. St. Mary's Soonoro Church, Kelakam
4. St. Behanam's Church, Cheeral, Wayanad

==== Kasaragod Zone ====
1. St. George’s Church, Kozhichal, Kannur
2. St. Mary’s Soonoro Church Kottamala, Kasaragod
3. St. George's Church Padanakkad, Kasaragod
4. St. George's Church Manjakkadu, Kannur
5. St. John's Church Poovathinkad, Kannur

=== Karnataka ===
==== N.R Pura Zone ====
1. St. George's Church, Narasimharajapura
2. St. Paul's Church, Muthinkoppa, Narasimharajapura
3. St. Ignatius Church Susalavani, Narasimharajapura
4. St. George's & St.John's Church Karugunda, Narasimharajapura
5. St. Mary's Church, Vorkatte, Narasimharajapura
6. St. Baselios Church, Gubbiga, Narasimharajapura
7. St. Mary's Church, Hubli

==== South Canara Zone ====
1. St. Mary's Soonoro Church, Renjiladi, Puttur
2. St. Thomas Church, Nelliyadi
3. St. George’s Church Shibaje, Belthangady
4. St. Mary's Church, Kunthoor, Perabe
5. St. George’s Church, Addahole
6. St. Simon's Church Ichilampady, Puttur
7. St. Mary's Church Kakkinje, Belthangady
8. St. Mary's Church Beluvai, Udupi
