= Chrysostomos Markose =

His Eminence Mor Chrysostomos Markose
- Metropolitan of E.A.E Arch Diocese of Syriac Orthodox Church, President of The Evangelistic Association of the East
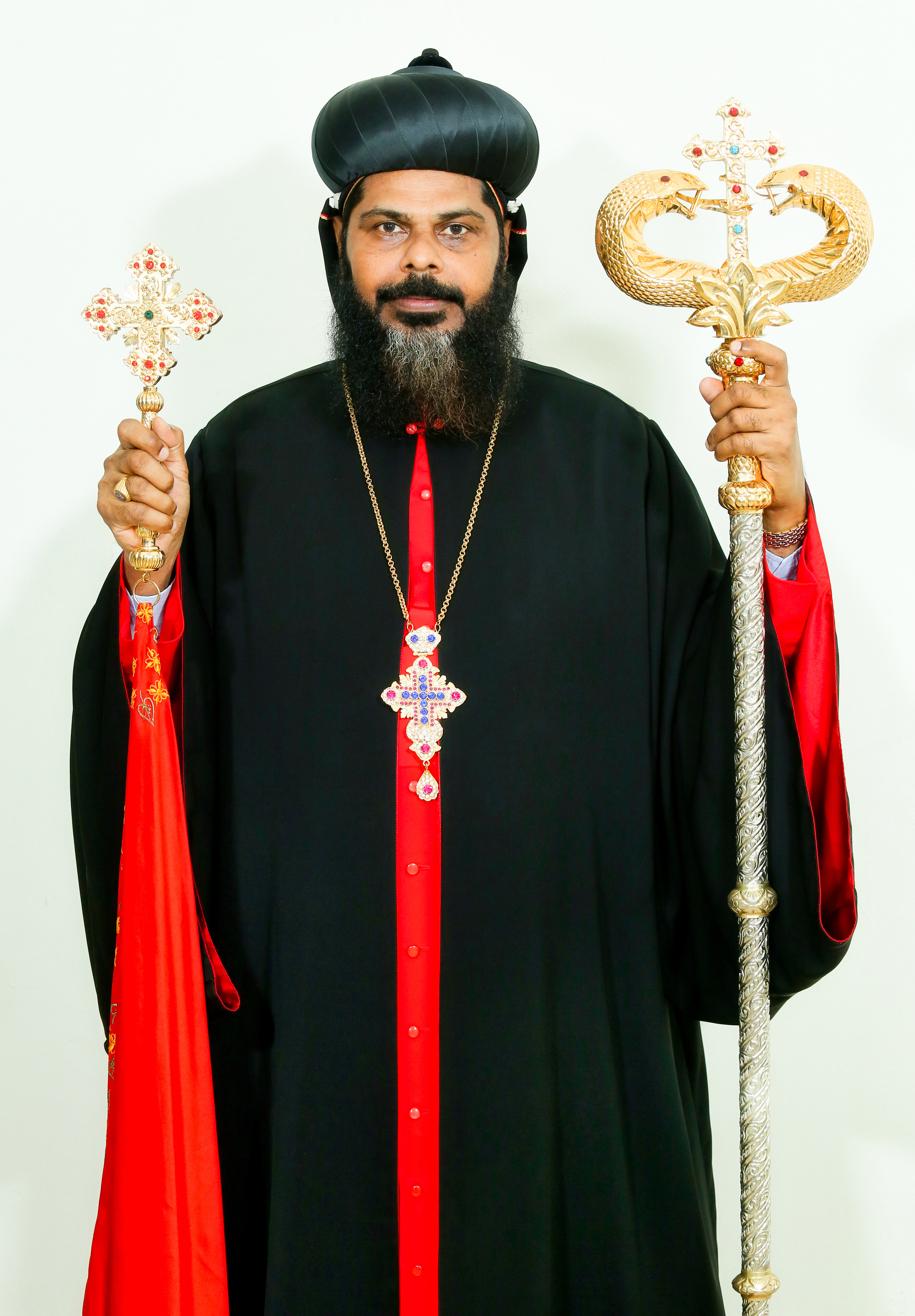
- Mor Chrysostomos Markose Metropolitan
- Church: Syrian Orthodox Church
- Diocese: Evangelistic Association of the East Archdiocese
- See: Holy Apostolic See of Antioch & All East
- In office: 1991—
- Predecessor: Polycarpose Geevarghese Metropolitan

Orders
- Ordination: 25 February 1995, (Kooroyo) by Mor Polycarpose Geevarghese Metropolitan
- Consecration: 14 July 2006 by Patriarch Ignatius Zakka I

Personal details
- Born: 26 September 1966; Thattekadu near Kothamangalam, Kerala, India
- Education: M.A Sociology, Diploma in Theology

Mor Chrysostomos Markose is a Syriac Orthodox arch bishop. He is the Bishop of E.A.E. Archdiocese of the Syriac Orthodox church in India.

== Early years ==
Jacob Markose was born to P. V, Jacob and Annakkutty of Pallathu House, Thattekkad, Angamali Diocese on 26 September 1966. In 1995, at the age of 29, he was ordained deacon and Kassisho on 9 January 1997 by Mor Polycarpose Geevarghese Metropolitan. In 1993 he took the initiative to organize Samajam Gospel Team and in 1994 he established Missionary training college and also became the secretary of the Mission society. In 1999 he was appointed as the Manager of the Samajam Publications and in 2000 he became the secretary of the E.A.E.In 2001 he was elected as the general secretary of the E.A.E and as the Manager of the St. Thomas Orphanage and the Santhome Public School at Perumbavoor. He has master's degree in Sociology and studied Theology and received a diploma in it.
