= Poothadi =

- Village
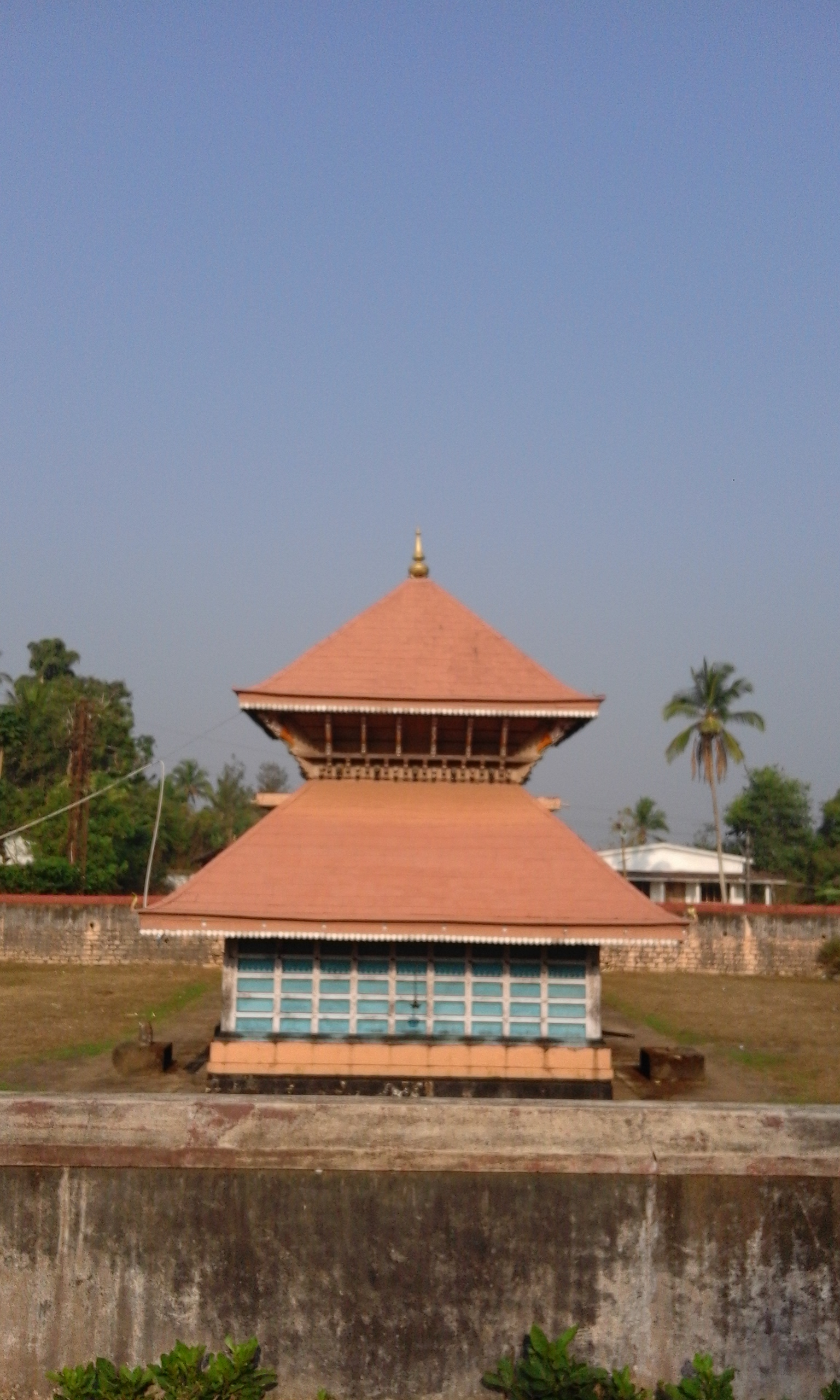
- Paradevatha Temple, Poothadi
- Country: India
- State: Kerala
- District: Wayanad
- Taluk: Sultan Bathery

Population (2011)
  - Total: 14,578

Languages
  - Official: Malayalam, English
- Time zone: UTC+5:30 (IST)
- PIN: 673596
- ISO 3166 code: IN-KL
- Vehicle registration: KL-73

Poothadi is a village in Wayanad district, Kerala, India, with its headquarters at Kenichira.

== Demographics ==
As of the 2011 India census, Poothadi had a population of 14,578, with 7,196 males and 7,382 females.

== Notorious abduction ==
Communist activists abducted Mr. V.N. Sasi of the Congress party to retain rule of the village's administration. The abduction occurred in the days preceding a non-confidence motion against the communist-elected president, as Sasi originally won the election under the communist party, but later joined the Congress party.

The abduction caused people to block the road at Kenichira. The division bench of the Kerala high court intervened. According to the police, a vehicle hired in Meenangadi was used for the abduction.

== Transportation ==
Poothadi is accessible through various roads. The nearest railway station and airport are 97km away, at Kozhikode. The Kannur and Bengaluru airports are 116km and 318km away respectively.

== Gallery ==
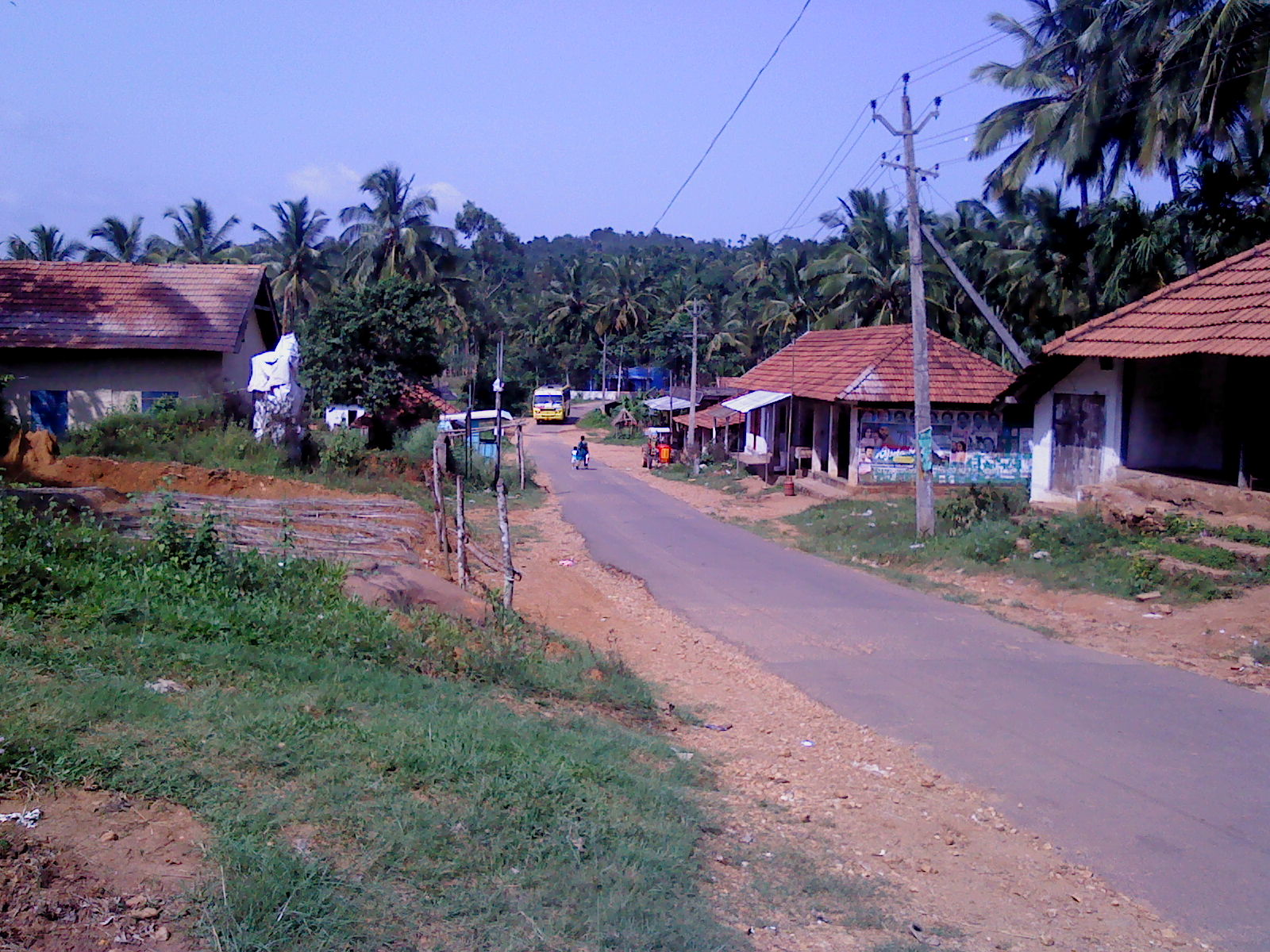
Valavayal village

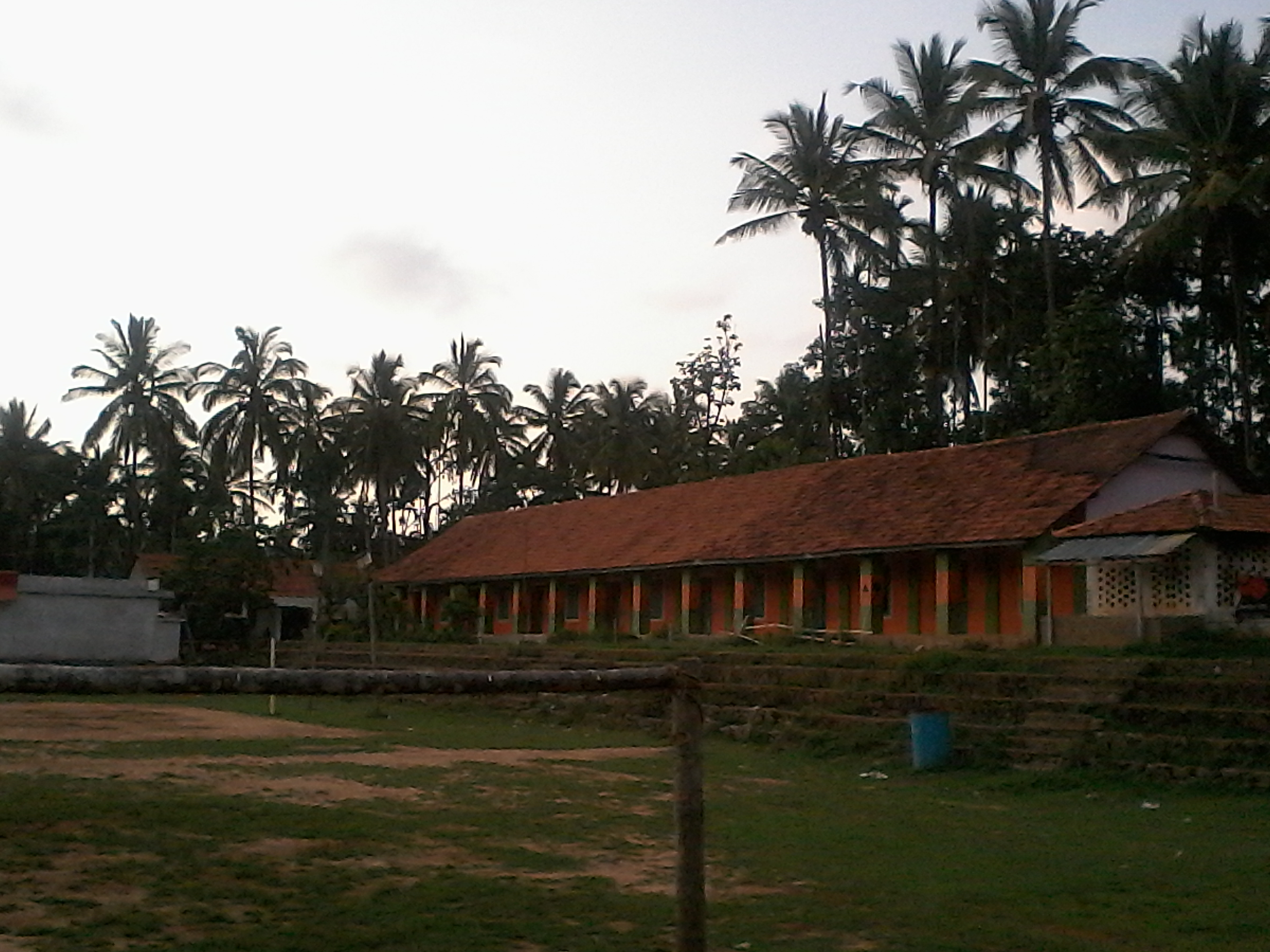
Valavayal high school

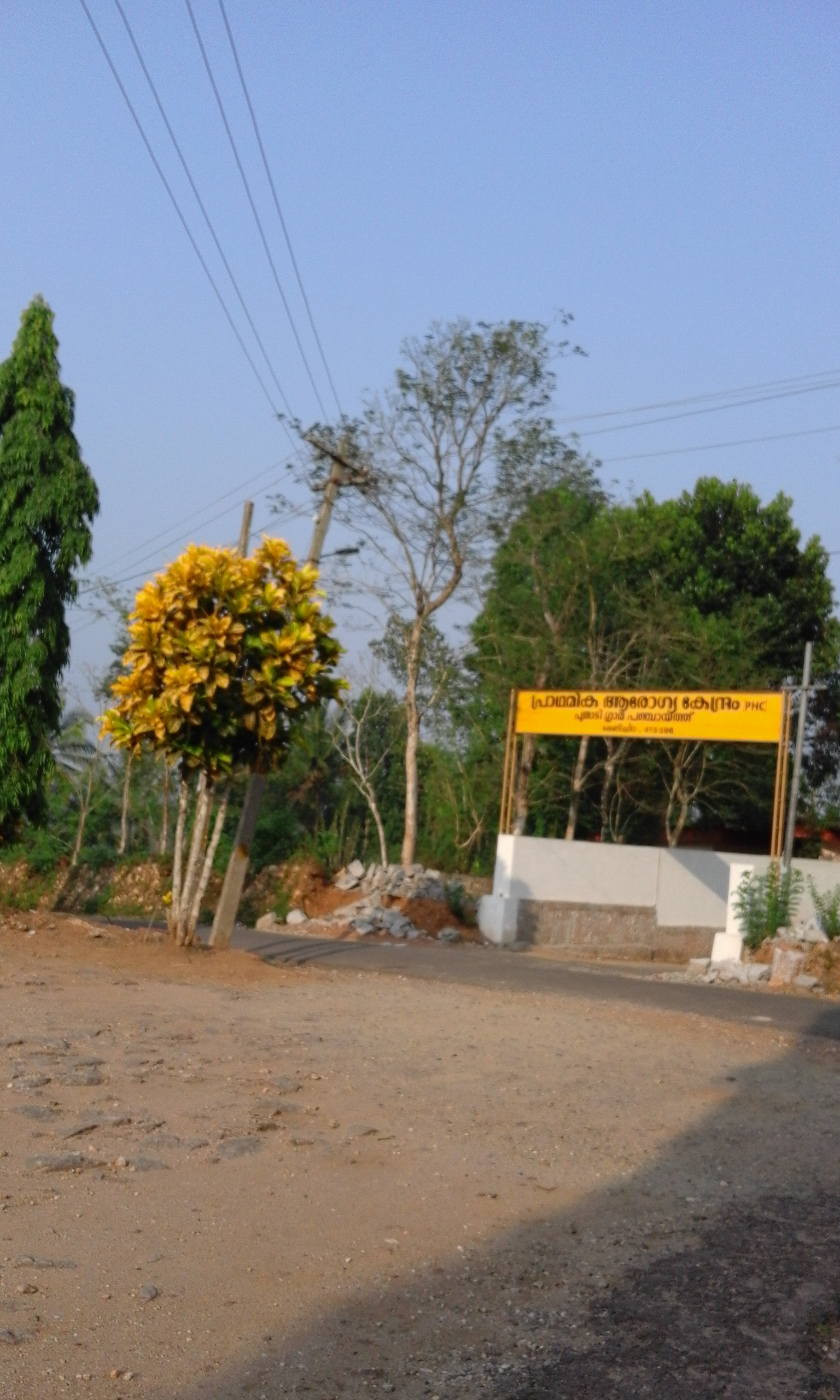
Kenichira clinic

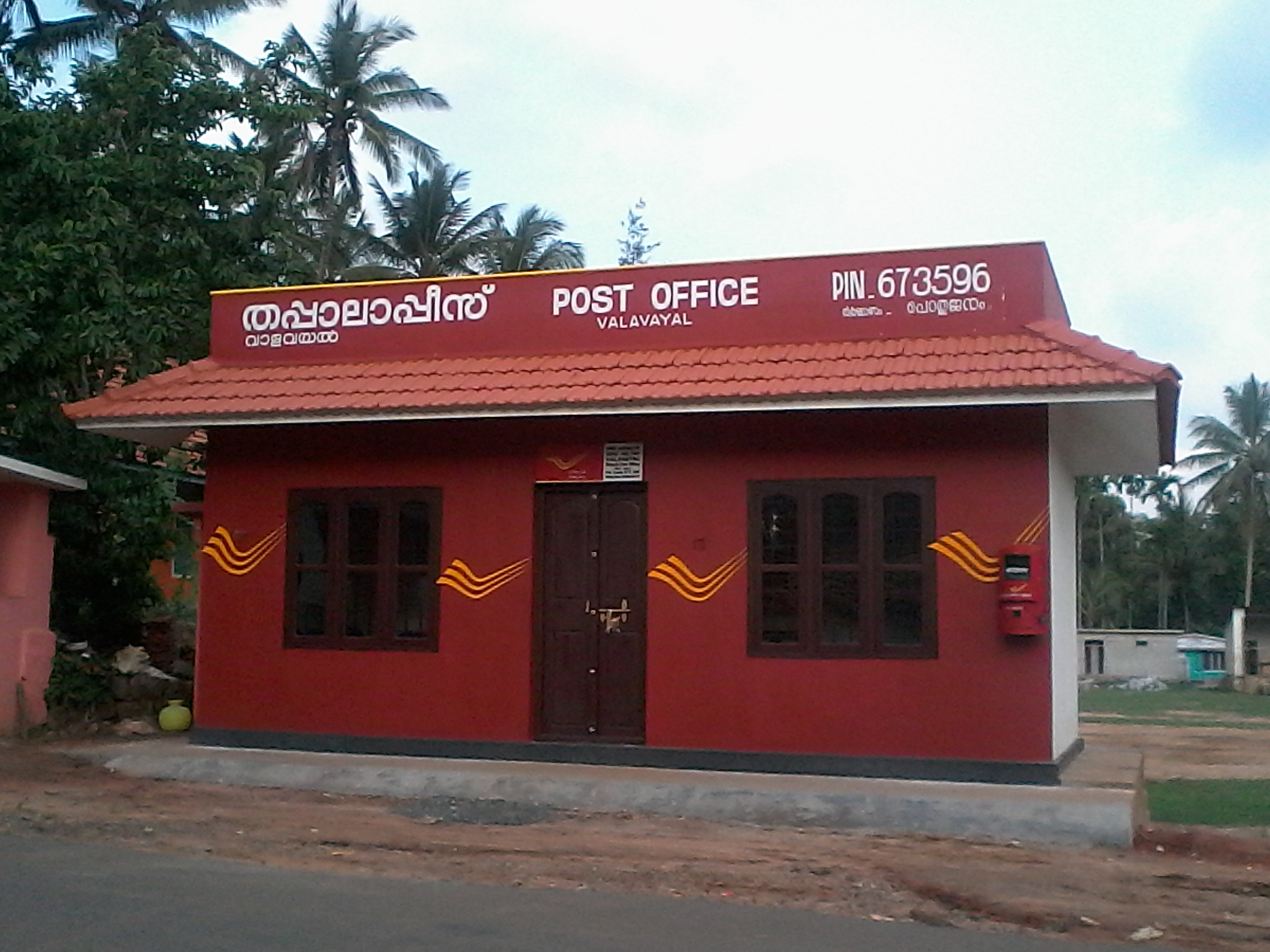
Valavayal post office

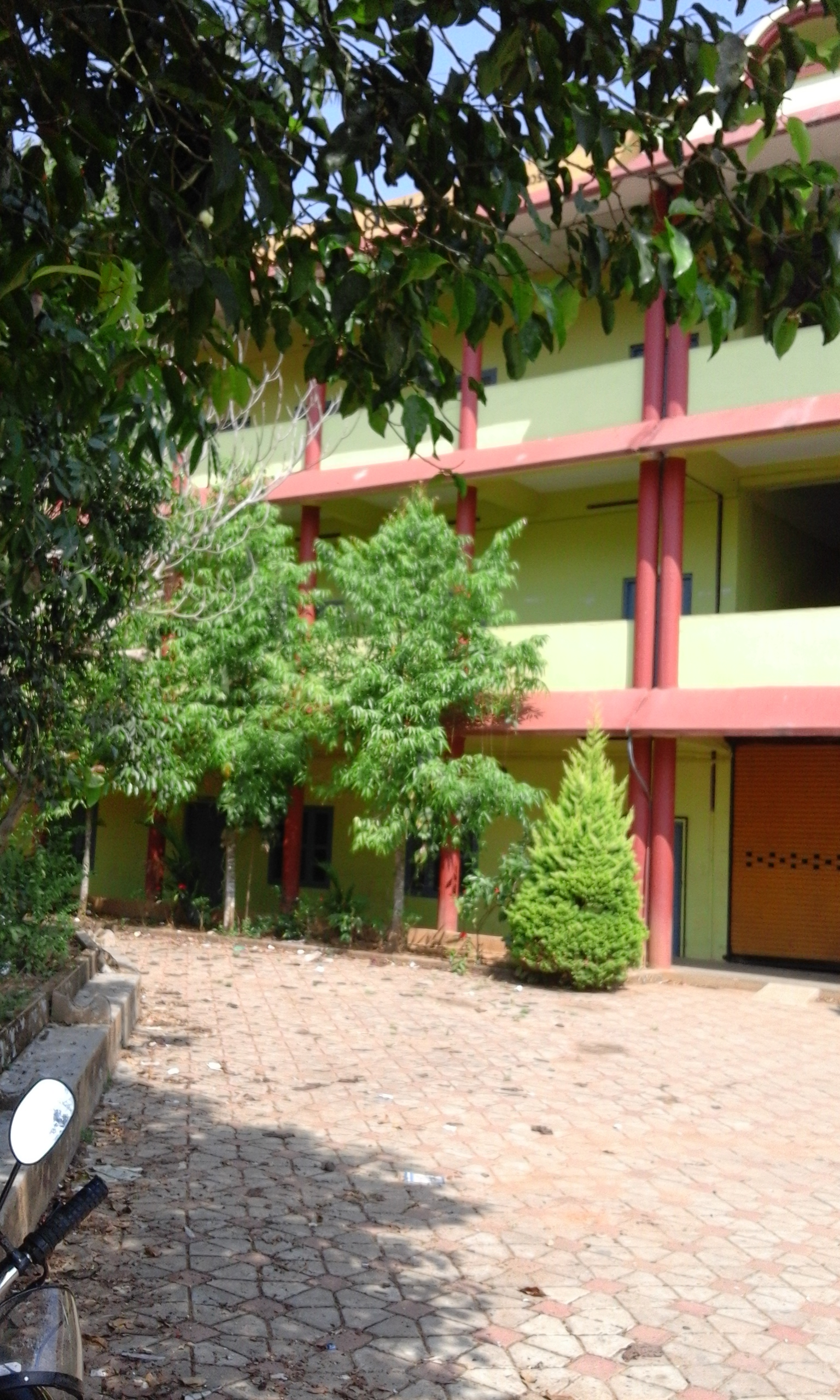
Poothadi high school
