= Valavayal =

- Town
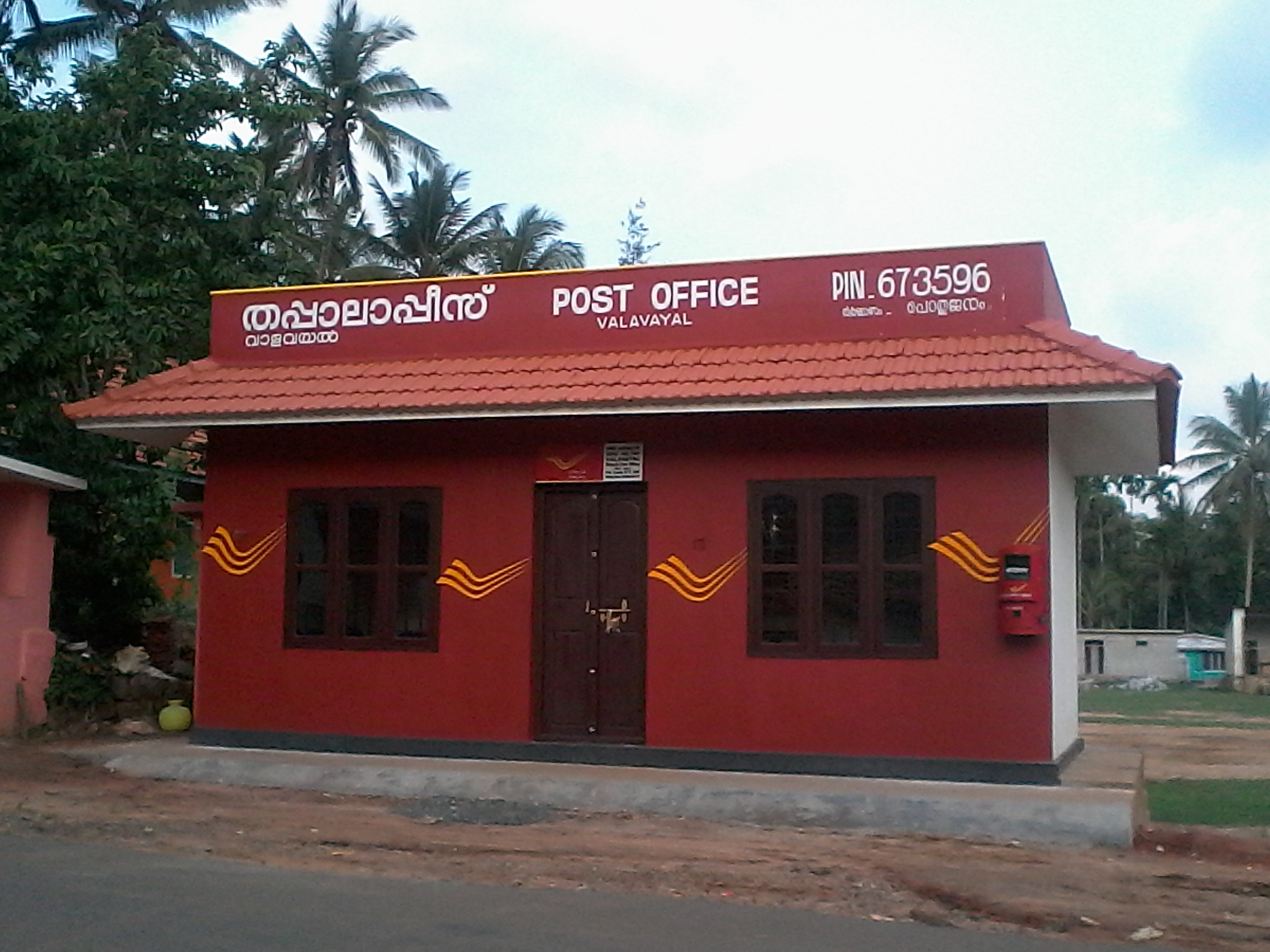
- Valvayal Post Office

- Location in Kerala, India Valavayal (India)
- Coordinates: 11.67°N 76.28°E
- Country: India
- State: Kerala
- District: Wayanad

Languages
  - Official: Malayalam, English
- Time zone: UTC+5:30 (IST)
- PIN: 673596
- Telephone code: 91 4936
- Vehicle registration: KL 12, KLW old

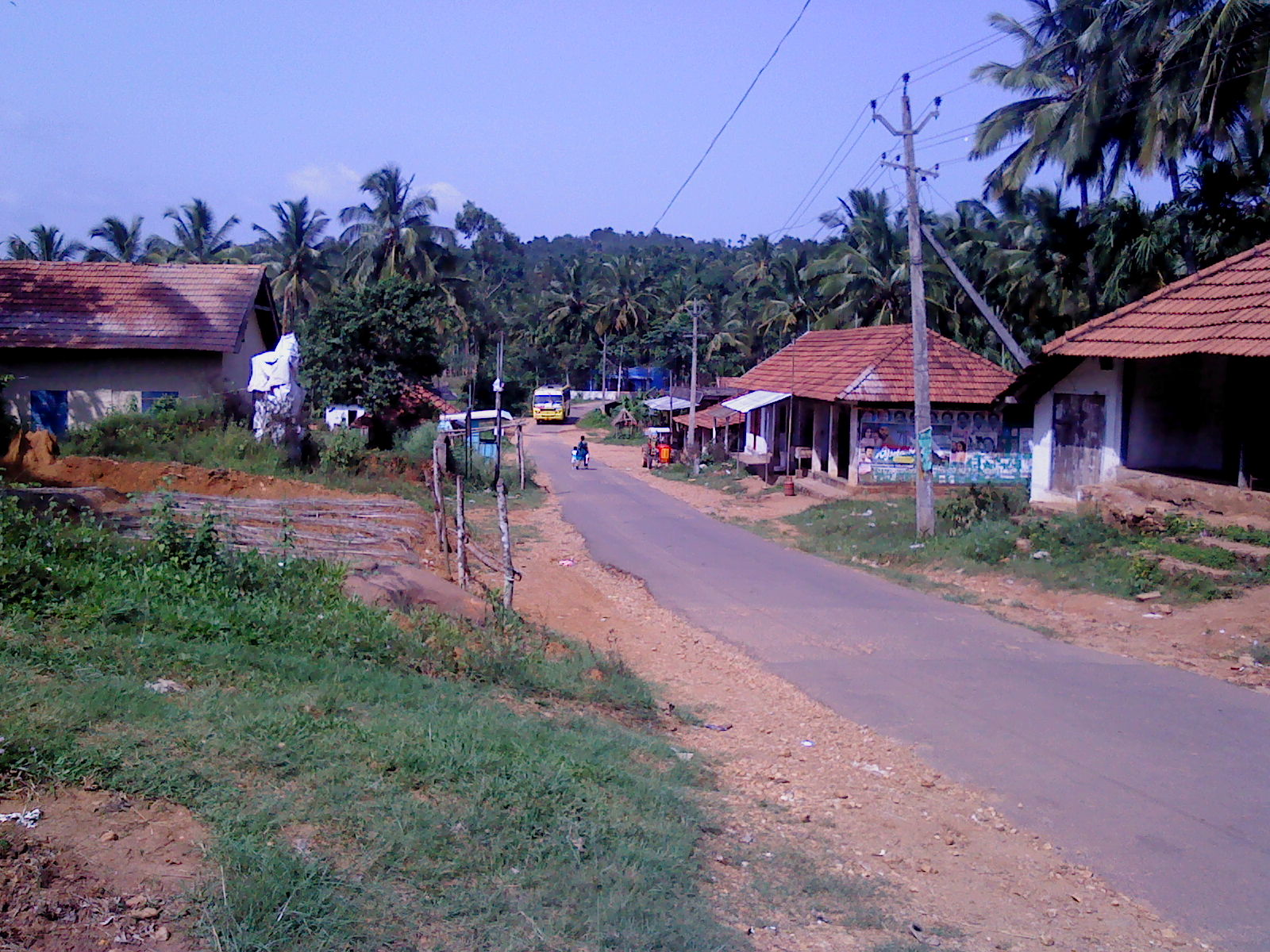
Valavayal

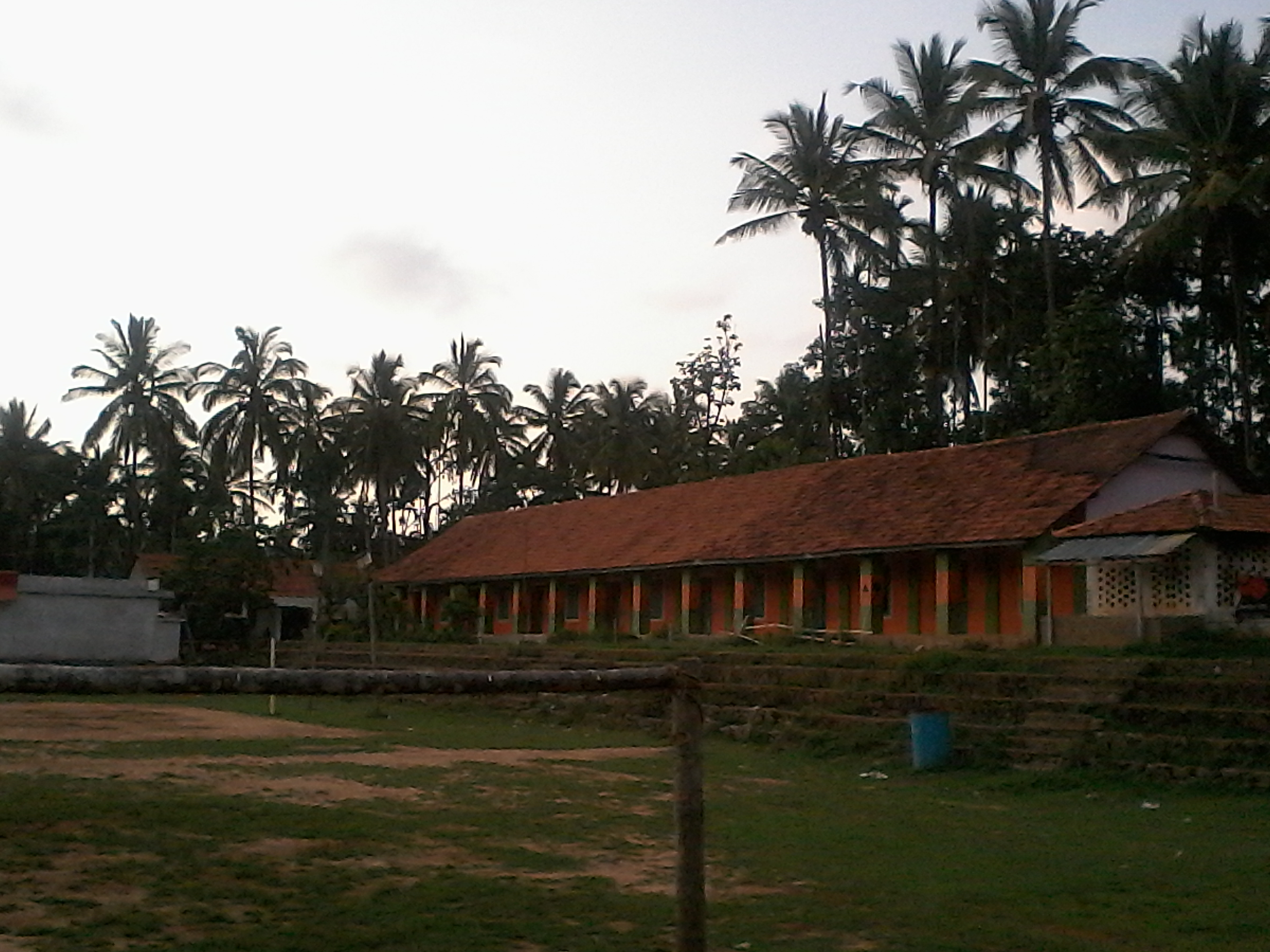
Valavayal High School

Valavayal is a small town in Wayanad district of Kerala, the people primarily depend on agriculture for a living.

The town has the Meenangadi-Pulpally road passing through it. The town is near to the Narasipuzha which will later join in Panamaram puzha after that it will known as Kabani. Sulthan Battery is the nearest town which is situated at about 930 metres above mean sea level. One can find beautiful folded hills across the horizon. The climate is pleasant throughout the year.

== People ==
Wayanad district stands first in the case of adivasi population (about 36%) among other districts in the state. There are people from almost all parts of Kerala who migrated to this fertile land for building up their lives.

== Climate ==
Valavayal has a salubrious climate. Lakkidi, Vythiri and Meppadi are the high rainfall areas in Wayanad. Annual rain falls in these high rainfall areas ranges from 3000 to 4000 m.m. High velocity winds are common during the southwest monsoon and dry winds blow in March–April. High altitude regions experience severe cold. In Wayanad (Ambalavayal) the mean maximum and minimum temperature for the last five years were 29 °C and 18 °C respectively. This place experiences a high relative humidity, which goes even up to 95 per cent during the Southwest monsoon period. Generally the year is classified in four seasons, namely, cold weather (December–February), hot weather (March–May), Southwest monsoon (June–September)and Northeast monsoon (October–November).

=== Monthly rainfall ===
Month	Jan	Feb	Mar	Apr	May	Jun	Jul	Aug	Sep	Oct	Nov	Dec
Rainfall in mm	13.6	13.6	13.3	118.1	58.4	607.9	378.1	626	249.9	122.4	43.3	1

== How To Reach ==
Valavayal has good roads, but is a rather Isolated village, with the nearest major city, Ooty, being 100 kilometers (62 miles) away. The major road is Meenagadi-Pulapally road.

== Local administration ==
Valavayal is a part of Poothadi panchayath.

== Important Landmarks ==
- Valavayal High School
- Valavaya Library
- Panjayathu ground
- Vattathany Mahavishnu Temple
- Valavayal Church
- Papplessery Masjid

== Healthcare ==
Valavayal has

- Government Primary Health Center
- Government Homeopathic Hospital

== Shopping ==
Stationery and agriculture products.
