= Syriac Orthodox Church =

Oriental Orthodox Church

Syriac Orthodox Church
- ܥܺܕܬܳܐ ܣܽܘ̣ܪܝܳܝܬܳܐ ܗܰܝܡܳܢܽܘܬܳܐ ܬܪܺܝܨܰܬ ܫܽܘ̣ܒ̣ܚܳܐ (Classical Syriac)
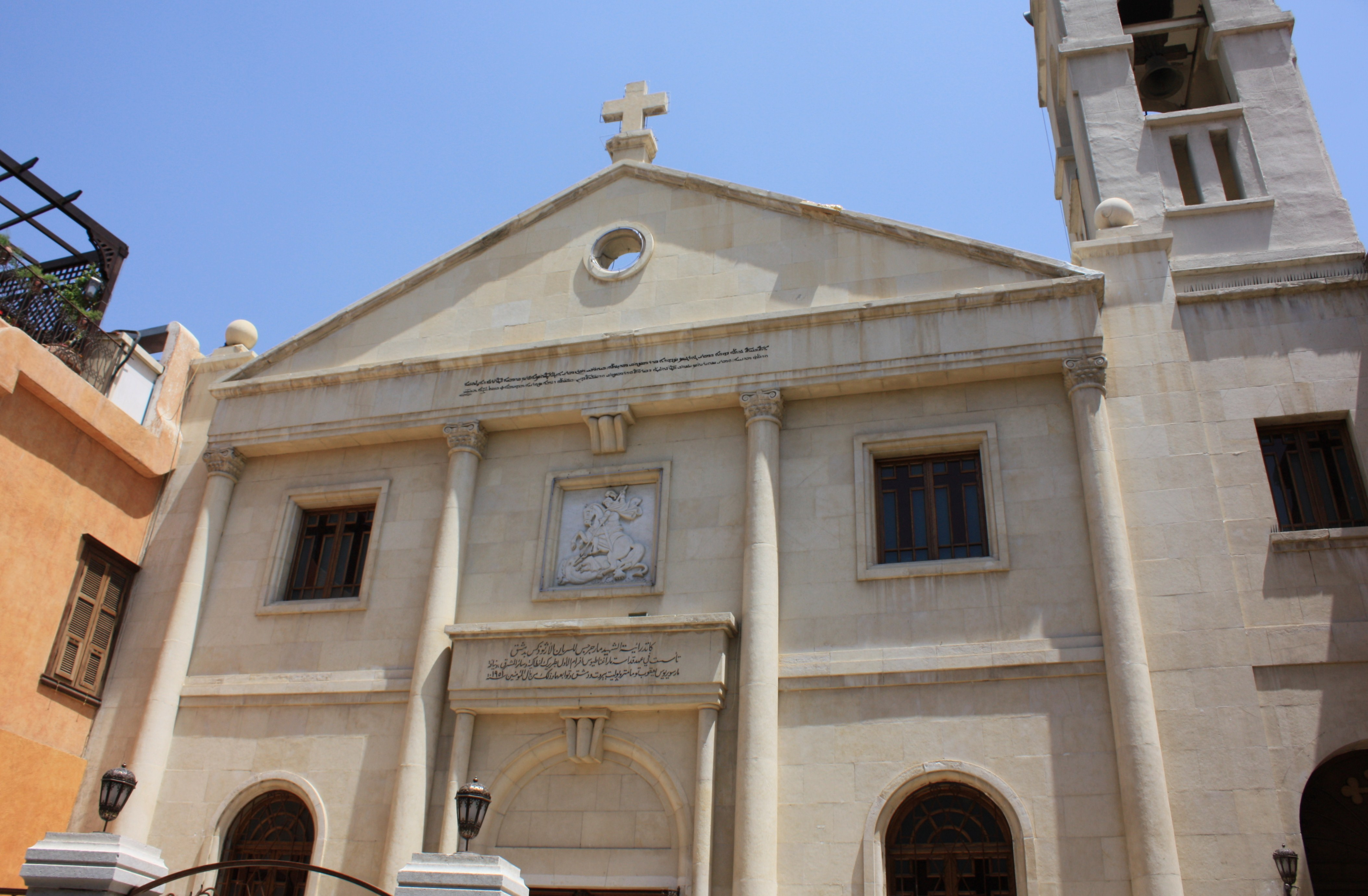
- Cathedral of Saint George, Damascus, Syria
- Type: Autocephaly
- Classification: Christian
- Orientation: Oriental Orthodox; Syriac
- Scripture: Peshitta
- Theology: Oriental Orthodox theology
- Polity: Episcopal
- Structure: Communion
- Patriarch: Ignatius Aphrem II
- Region: Middle East, India, and diaspora
- Language: Classical Syriac
- Liturgy: West Syriac: Liturgy of Saint James
- Headquarters: Cathedral of St. George, Damascus, Syria (since 1959)
- Founder: Apostles Peter and Paul
- Origin: 1st century Antioch, Roman Empire
- Independence: 512
- Branched from: Church of Antioch
- Members: Approximately 1.5 million (including 1.2 million members of the Syriac Orthodox in India)
- Aid organization: EPDC St. Ephrem Patriarchal Development Committee
- Other names: Arabic: الكنيسة السريانية الأرثوذكسية; Malayalam: സുറിയാനി ഓർത്തഡോക്സ് സഭ, romanized: Suriyāni ōrtḥdōx Sabḥa; Spanish: Iglesia católica apostólica siro-ortodoxa de Antioquía
- Official website: Syriac Orthodox Patriarchate
- Digital Library: Department of Syriac Studies
- *Origin is according to Sacred tradition. West Syriac Cross Unicode (U+2670) : ♰

The Syriac Orthodox Church (Note: Officially known as the Syriac Orthodox Patriarchate of Antioch and All the East) (Classical Syriac: ܥܺܕܬܳܐ ܣܽܘܪܝܳܝܬܳܐ ܬܪܺܝܨܰܬ݂ ܫܽܘܒܚܳܐ, romanized: ʿIdto Sūryoyto Trīṣāth Šubḥō), also informally known as the Jacobite Church, is an Oriental Orthodox church that traces back to the ancient Church of Antioch. The church currently has around 1.5 million followers worldwide. The church upholds the Miaphysite doctrine in Christology and employs the Liturgy of Saint James, associated with James the Just. Classical Syriac is the official and liturgical language of the church.

The supreme head of the Syriac Orthodox Church is the patriarch of Antioch, a bishop who, according to sacred tradition, continues the leadership passed down from Saint Peter. Since 2014, Ignatius Aphrem II has served as the Syriac Orthodox Antiochian patriarch. The Great Church of Antioch was the patriarchal seat and the headquarters of the church until c. 518, after which Severus of Antioch had to flee to Alexandria, Egypt. After the death of Severus, the patriarchal seat moved from Egypt to different monasteries like the Mor Bar Sauma Monastery; some patriarchs also set up headquarters in Antioch temporarily. Later, Mor Hananyo Monastery was declared as the patriarchal seat and the headquarters of the church from c. 1160 until 1932. In 1959, the patriarchal seat and headquarters were relocated to the Cathedral of Saint George in Bab Tuma, Damascus, Syria, due to conflicts in the region.

The Syriac Orthodox Church comprises 26 archdioceses and 13 patriarchal vicariates. It also has an autonomous maphrianate based in India, the Jacobite Syrian Christian Church.

The Syriac Orthodox Church became distinct in 512 when Severus, a leader who opposed the Council of Chalcedon, was chosen as patriarch after a synod was held at Laodicea, Syria. This happened after Emperor Anastasius I removed the previous patriarch, Flavian II, who supported Chalcedon. Severus's later removal in 518 was not recognized by majority of the Syriac speakers in and out of Antioch, and this led to the establishment of an independent Miaphysite patriarchate headed by Severus. In the 6th century, a bishop named Jacob Baradaeus helped strengthen this Miaphysite patriarchate. Meanwhile, those who supported Council of Chalcedon formed what later became the Greek Orthodox Church of Antioch and the Maronite Church.

== Name and identity ==
=== Meaning of "Syriac" ===
Syriac-speaking Christians refer to their church, their language, and themselves via the native endonym Sūryōyō. This term, derived from the region of Syria (itself derived from Assyria, initially referring to both Mesopotamia and the Levant), was coined as a self-designation by Christians in Edessa in at least the fifth century AD, quickly gaining widespread usage in both what would come to be called the West and East Syriac traditions. In Arabic (the official language of Syria), the church is known as the "Kenissa Suryaniya", and the term Sūryānī identifies the Syriac language and people. Chalcedonians refer to the church as "Jacobite" (after Jacob Baradaeus) since the schism that followed the Council of Chalcedon in 451 AD. English-speaking historians identified the church as the "Syrian Church". The English term "Syrian" was first used to translate Sūryōyō, derived from Latin Syrus. The Syriac term Trīṣāth Šubḥō, attested in Classical Syriac texts and literally means "righteous glory", is translated to English as "orthodox" (from Ancient Greek: ὀρθοδοξία, romanized: orthodoxía, lit. 'correct opinion'), which is a term used to identify churches that practiced the set of doctrines believed by early Christians. Since 1922, the term "Syrian" started being used for things named after the Syrian Federation; hence, in 2000, the Holy Synod ruled that the church be named as "Syriac Orthodox Church" to avoid confusion.

Aside from "Syriac" and "Syrian", the endonym Sūryōyō has also commonly been identified as Assyrian and Aramean, with many Syriac Orthodox Church Fathers preserving auxiliary traditions of the Assyrian Empire and Aramean kingdoms. In the chronicle of Patriarch Dionysius I Telmaharoyo, the origin of the word "Syria" was attributed to a legendary king named Syrus, who ruled a kingdom west of the Euphrates, which he expanded east of the Euphrates. He declared on a geographic basis that "proper Syrians" were the inhabitants west of the Euphrates who lived in geographical Syria, the core of Syrus's kingdom, with those living east of it being "metaphorical Syrians", who—although not "Syrian" geographically—did speak the Syriac language, with the foundation for the Syriac language being east of the Euphrates in Edessa. Patriarch Michael the Syrian interpreted the Syrians west of the Euphrates geographically as "Arameans" and the Syrians east of the Euphrates as "Assyrians", while also elsewhere identifying "Syrian", "Aramean", "Chaldean", and "Assyrian" with each other.

=== Translation dispute ===
Prior to the 19th century, it was most common for Sūryōyō to be translated as "Syrus", "Syrien", or "Syrian" in Latin, French and English, respectively, as in "Ephrem the Syrian". During the visit of Patriarch Peter III/IV to London, the initial translation employed in English was "Syrian". In the United States, where the early community, largely of ethnically Assyrian—though Armenian-speaking— migrants from Harput and Diyarbakır came to unite under the name "Assyrian Orthodox" or "Assyrian Apostolic", likely owing both to the usage of "Asouri" to translate Sūryōyō in their native Armenian tongue, and also to distinguish themselves from Arabic-speaking Greek Orthodox migrants that arrived from Ottoman Syria, who already began referring to their parishes as "Syrian Orthodox". These migrants established the Assyrian Orthodox parishes of Worcester and West New York. Another wave of migrants from Midyat established the Assyrian Orthodox parish of Central Falls. While these were native Aramaic speakers, they adopted the common name already used by the Armenian speakers. Internally, within the Assyrian Orthodox community, there was no translation dispute, which would only start to become a major issue in the 1950s with the movement to create an Archdiocese of North America, especially as a new wave of native Arabic- and Aramaic-speaking migrants from Palestine would establish new parishes under the name "Syrian Orthodox".

Although soon-to-be-patriarch Ignatius Aphrem I, then-Archbishop Severus Aphram Barsoum, used "Assyrian" in the Paris Peace Conference when supporting the Assyrian independence movement, he preferred to translate the church's name in English as "Syrian", with the English term Assyrian implying Ōthūrōyō in Syriac rather than Sūryōyō (which was mostly translated as "Syrian"), insisting it should be used in his 1927 visit to the United States, to which parishes expressed disapproval. A few decades later, the issue was brought up again under the now-patriarch Ignatius Aphrem I and Mor Athanasius Yeshue, then-Archbishop of Jerusalem and Patriarchal Vicar to North America and soon-to-be Archbishop of the United States and Canada, specifically amidst the arrival of fellow Arabic-speaking Syriac Orthodox faithful from Palestine who were more familiar with the name "Syrian". Mor Athanasius would use the name "Assyrian" to denote his standing in the United States, while using "Syrian" to refer to the church. Parishes established after this period would use the name "Syrian Orthodox" unlike the earlier established parishes that went by "Assyrian Orthodox". Thus, Ignatius Aphrem I wrote the 1952 publication The Syrian Church of Antioch: It's [sic] Name and History, insisting that the use of the English term "Assyrian" for the church contradicts "1. the historical truth, 2. ancient tradition, 3. the identity of our nation in all countries, and 4. the consensus of Western scholars: French, English, German, Italian, and American", favoring the name "Syrian" or even "Syrian-Aramean", though only "Syrian" would see any official usage.

All new parishes established after 1950 already agreed on the "Syrian" name by 14 May 1953, alongside the older Assyrian Orthodox Church in Central Falls, which—although bearing the Assyrian name—was established by immigrants from Midyat and not Harput/Diyarbakır as the others were. Around this same time, legal rights to the name "Syrian Orthodox" in the United States were won from the Greek Orthodox, and a corporation was established in the name of the Archdiocese of Antioch in order to lobby for an Archdiocese of North America. The parishes of Worcester and West New York were the only ones that continued to put up resistance. This dispute would continue for the remainder of Ignatius Aphrem I's patriarchate, but a compromise was often reached using "Suryani Orthodox Church". George Kiraz mentions that some of the elderly remember a more fierce denial of the "Assyrian" name by Mor Athanasius and Mor Aphrem Barsoum during his visit to North America, stating that there is likely a large oral component to the early dispute, but noting from letters such as that of Charles Manoog to Mor Athanasius that "no member of the diocesan committee or our archbishop has ever asked these two churches to change their name from Assyrian to Syrian. It is some members of these churches who insist that the diocese name and the name of our patriarchate and our religion be changed to Assyrian instead of Syrian".

The formation of the archdiocese under Patriarch Ignatius Ya'qub III led to an establishment of the Archdiocese of North America with full patriarchal support, with the patriarch soon conducting an official visit in 1960. The parishes of Worcester and West New York insisted on remaining under the Archdiocese of Antioch as late as 1959, and even planned to write to the patriarch prior to his visit. During his visit, they presented their demand which the patriarch rejected, soon preparing for a legal battle if it would come to it. Ultimately, they came to an agreement in October 1960, explicitly being allowed to retain their names, although being required to be subject to the newly established archdiocese at the threat of excommunication. The switch from "Assyrian" to "Syrian" would also occur in Mor Athanasius's other archdiocese, Jerusalem, where "Assyrian" and "Syrian" were previously used interchangeably. Church gatherings in Los Angeles have also taken place at the Assyrian Hall in the 1960s. Later on, the parish in Worcester was also renamed to "Syrian", leaving the Assyrian Orthodox Church of the Virgin Mary in Paramus, New Jersey (formerly in West New York) to be the only parish that still bears the name "Assyrian Orthodox Church".

The "Aramean" name would seldom play a role in the early translation dispute, though Ignatius Aphrem I initially cited "Aramean" or "Syrian-Aramean" as accurate ways to translate Sūryōyō. Early Syriac Orthodox writers in North America, such as Naum Faiq, writing in Syriac and Arabic, used the words "Assyrian", "Syrian", and "Aramean" interchangeably, a trend that was also seen in the works of the archbishop of Mardin, Philoxenos Yuhanon Dolabani, and even Patriarch Ignatius Ya'qub III himself, then-archbishop of Lebanon and Damascus, stating, "We are the Assyrians and Arameans who during the early ages were the forerunners of the civilized nations who gave humanity education and knowledge". It was in Europe following the rise of secular "Assyrian" and "Aramean" associations where the translation dispute rose, with many clergymen like Julius Yeshu Çiçek supporting a strictly Aramean identity. To clarify the church's identity amidst this dispute, the Holy Synod under Ignatius Zakka I stated that since St. Peter, "head of the Apostles, established its See in Antioch-Syria until this day", the church is known as the "Syrian Orthodox Church" (ʿIdto Suryoyto Orthodoxoytho), its language the "Syriac language" (Leshono Suryoyo), and its people the "Syrian people" (ʿAmo Suryoyo). While the Synod did not explicitly condemn the usage of such names, Ignatius Zakka I and the Syrian Orthodox Church's board in Sweden would take a strict stance against both secular "Assyrian" and "Aramean" associations, viewing them as sources of division. Following a dispute among the Syriac Orthodox community of Los Angeles made up of Arabic-speaking immigrants from Palestine (who preferred "Aramaic") and from Syria (who preferred "Syrian"), a compromise was made where the signage on the church building would read "Syrian Orthodox Church according to the Aramaic rite".

Under the current leadership of Patriarch Ignatius Aphrem II, the naming dispute within the church has largely toned down, with the patriarch insisting on using the label Sūryōyō to unite the community. In 2017, he addressed a letter to the World Council of Arameans in which he criticized the organization for attempting to examine the convictions of the church in regards to the dispute, seeking to rename the church to the "Syriac-Aramean Orthodox Church", and issued statements indicating that the church did not take a clear stance on Aramean identity.

== History ==
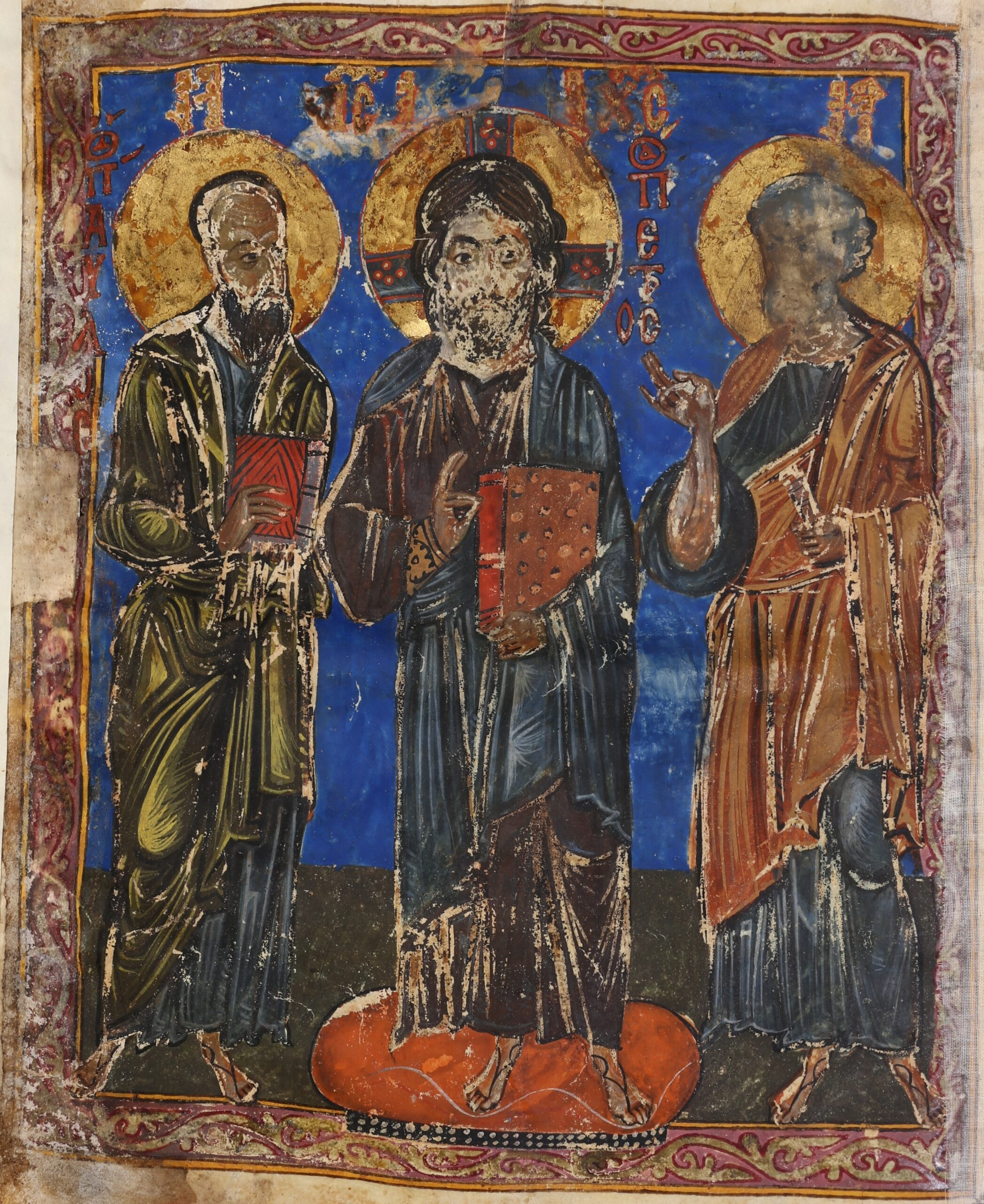
A Syriac Orthodox icon of Jesus Christ, Saint Peter, and Saint Paul.

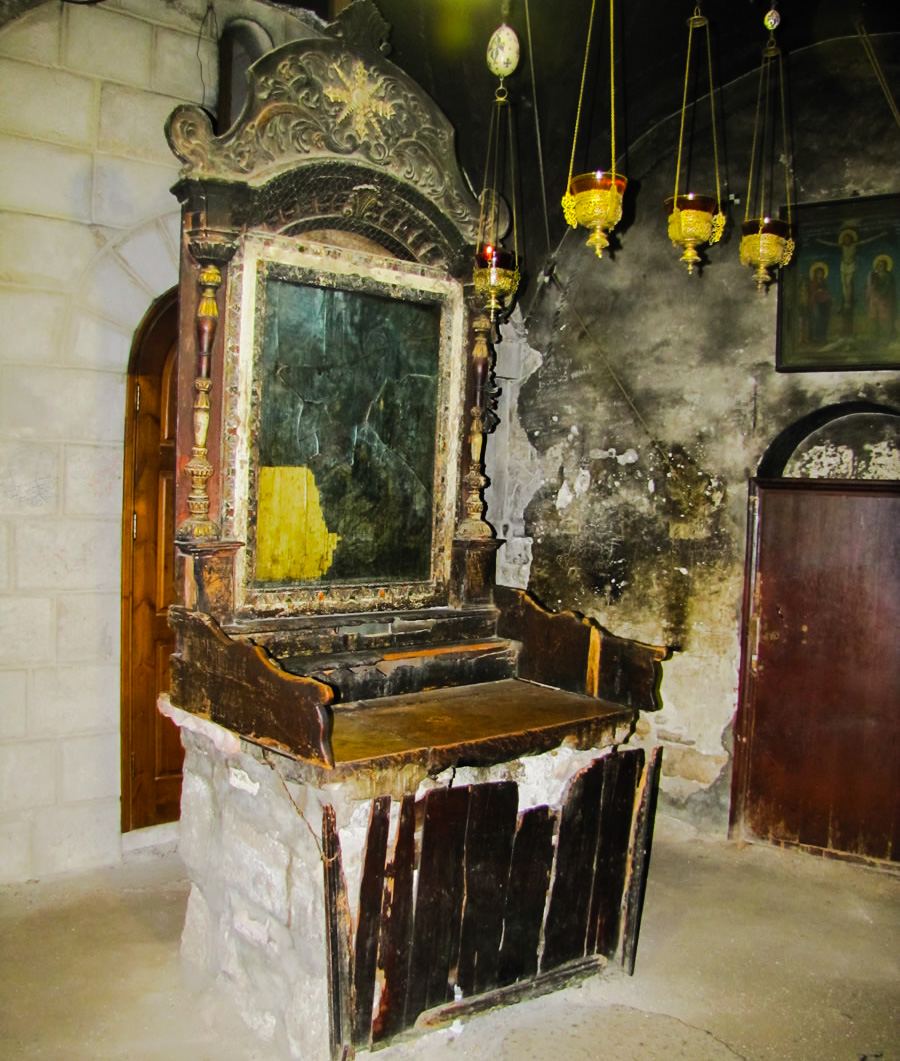
Syriac Orthodox Chapel of Saints Joseph of Arimathea and Nicodemus, Church of the Holy Sepulchre, Jerusalem

=== Early history ===
The church claims apostolic succession through the pre-Chalcedonian Patriarchate of Antioch to the early Christian communities from Jerusalem led by Saint Barnabas and Saint Paul in Antioch, during the Apostolic era, as described in the Acts of the Apostles; "The disciples were first called Christians in Antioch" (Acts 11:26). Saint Peter was selected by Jesus Christ (Matthew 16:18) and is venerated as the first bishop of Antioch in c. 37 AD after the Incident at Antioch.

Saint Evodius was the second bishop of Antioch until 66 AD and was succeeded by Saint Ignatius of Antioch. The earliest recorded use of the term "Christianity" (Greek: Χριστιανισμός) was by Ignatius of Antioch, in around 100 AD. In A.D 169, Theophilus of Antioch wrote three apologetic tracts to Autolycus. Patriarch Babylas of Antioch was considered the first saint recorded as having had his remains moved (or "translated") for religious purposes, a practice that was to become extremely common in later centuries. Eustathius of Antioch joined Athanasius of Alexandria in opposing the followers of the condemned doctrine of Arius during the Arian controversy at the First Council of Nicaea. During the time of Meletius of Antioch, the church split due to his being deposed for Homoiousian leanings which became known as the Meletian Schism, and saw several groups and claimants to the See of Antioch.

==== Patriarchate of Antioch ====
Given the antiquity of the bishopric of Antioch and the importance of the Christian community in the city of Antioch, a commercially significant city in the eastern parts of the Roman Empire, the First Council of Nicaea recognized the bishopric as one of the main regional primacies in Christendom, with jurisdiction over the administrative Diocese of the Orient, thus laying the foundation for the creation of the "Patriarchate of Antioch and All of the East". Because of the significance attributed to Ignatius of Antioch in the church, most of the Syriac Orthodox patriarchs since 1293 have used the name of Ignatius in the title of the patriarch preceding their own patriarchal name.

Christological controversies that followed the Council of Chalcedon did not result in the development of a separate community for those who became Miaphysites, though it became the catalyst for the development of a unique Syriac Orthodox identity. It later resulted in a long struggle for the patriarchate between those who accepted and those who rejected the council. In 512, pro-Chalcedonian patriarch Flavian II of Antioch was deposed by Emperor Anastasius I, and on 6 November 512, at the synod of Laodicea in Syria, Severus of Antioch, a notable Miapyhsite theologian, was elected and later consecrated on 16 November at the Great Church of Antioch. In 518, he was exiled from Antioch by the new emperor, Justin I, who tried to enforce a uniform Chalcedonian doctrine throughout the empire. Those who belonged to the pro-Chalcedonian party accepted newly appointed patriarch Paul the Jew. The Miaphysite patriarchate was thus forced to leave Antioch, with Severus the Great taking refuge in Alexandria. The non-Chalcedonian community was divided between "Severians" (followers of Severus), and Julianists (followers of Julian of Halicarnassus), a division that remained unresolved until 527. Severians continued to recognize Severus as the legitimate Miaphysite Patriarch of Antioch until his death in 538, and then proceeded to follow his successors.

Jacob Baradaeus, bishop of Edessa, is credited for ordaining most of the Miaphysite hierarchy while facing heavy persecution in the sixth century. In 544, Baradaeus ordained Sergius of Tella, continuing the non-Chalcedonian succession of patriarchs of the Church of Antioch. This was done in opposition to the Byzantine-backed patriarchate of Antioch held by the pro-Chalcedonian believers, leading to the Syriac Orthodox Church becoming popularly known as the Jacobite Church, while the Chalcedonian believers were known popularly as Melkites, derived from the Syriac word for king, malka (an implication of the Chalcedonian Church's relationship to the Roman emperor, later taken up by the Melkite Greek Catholic Church as an official name). Due to numerous historical upheavals and hardships, the patriarchate of the Syriac Orthodox Church was relocated to various monasteries in Mesopotamia for centuries. John III of the Sedre was elected and consecrated Patriarch after the death of Athanasius I Gammolo in 631 AD, followed by the fall of Roman Syria and the Muslim conquest of the Levant. John and several bishops were summoned before Emir Umayr ibn Sad al-Ansari of Hims to engage in an open debate regarding Christianity and represent the entire Christian community, including non-Syriac Orthodox communities, such as Greek Orthodox Syrians. The rise of Islam did not change the position of clergy in leading the church, and they acted as the leaders of their community.

=== Middle Ages ===
Syriac Orthodox dioceses in the medieval period Cilicia Palestine Syria Lebanon and Cyprus Cappadocia Amid and Arzun Commagene Osrhoene Mardin and Tur Abdin Iraq

By the seventh century AD, the Syriac Orthodox identity began to see the adoption of Edessan Aramaic become one of its strongest features. (Note: The use of Edessan Aramaic, however, was not an indication of defining themselves with the ancient Arameans.) The eighth-century hagiography Life of Jacob Baradaeus provides evidence of a definite denominational and social differentiation between the Chalcedonians and Miaphysites (Syriac Orthodox). The longer hagiography indicates that the Syriac Orthodox, referred to as Suryoye Yaquboye (Syriac Jacobites), in the work, identified more closely with Jacob's story than with those of other saints. The Coptic historian and Miaphysite bishop Severus ibn al-Muqaffa discusses the origins of the Jacobites and their veneration of Jacob Baradaeus. He asserted that, unlike the Chalcedonian Christians (referred to as "Melkites"), Miaphysite Jacobites never compromised their orthodoxy to win the favor of the Byzantine emperors, as the Melkites had done.

In the tenth century, after the Byzantine reconquest of Cappadocia, Cilicia and Syria, the Byzantine emperor encouraged Syriac settlement of these newly conquered frontier lands, leading to a period of economic and intellectual flourishing for Syriac Orthodox communities from 950 to 1020. The 65th patriarch John VII Sarigta and his two successors resided at the Monastery of Bārid, close to Melitene, one of many newly founded monasteries at the time, and Syriac Orthodox Christians were granted access to imperial positions. The wealth and influence of the Syriac Orthodox communities then sparked conflicts with the Byzantine Church, which began to persecute Syriac Orthodox Christians, forcing Patriarch Dionysius IV to relocate the seat to Amida.

Before the advent of the Crusades in the eleventh century, the Syriacs occupied much of the hill country of Jazira (Upper Mesopotamia) and lived under the rule of the Abbasid Caliphate. In Antioch, after the eleventh-century persecutions by the Byzantines, the Syriac Orthodox population was almost extinguished. Only one Jacobite church is recorded in Antioch in the first half of the twelfth century, leading Dorothea Weltecke to conclude that the Syriac Orthodox population was very low in this period in Antioch and its surroundings.

This changed during the twelfth century when the Crusader states were established. Scholars agree generally that relations between the Syriac Orthodox and Latins in Outremer were positive. The Syriac population in the Principality of Antioch grew, partly due to the influx of refugees, which was also reflected in the construction of two additional churches. During this period, several Syriac Orthodox patriarchs visited Antioch, with some even establishing temporary residences there, and the Syriac Orthodox hierarchy in Antioch was open to accepting Latin supervision. Nevertheless, they stayed officially independent, though they also engaged in ecumenical dialogue with the Byzantines and Latins regarding church union.

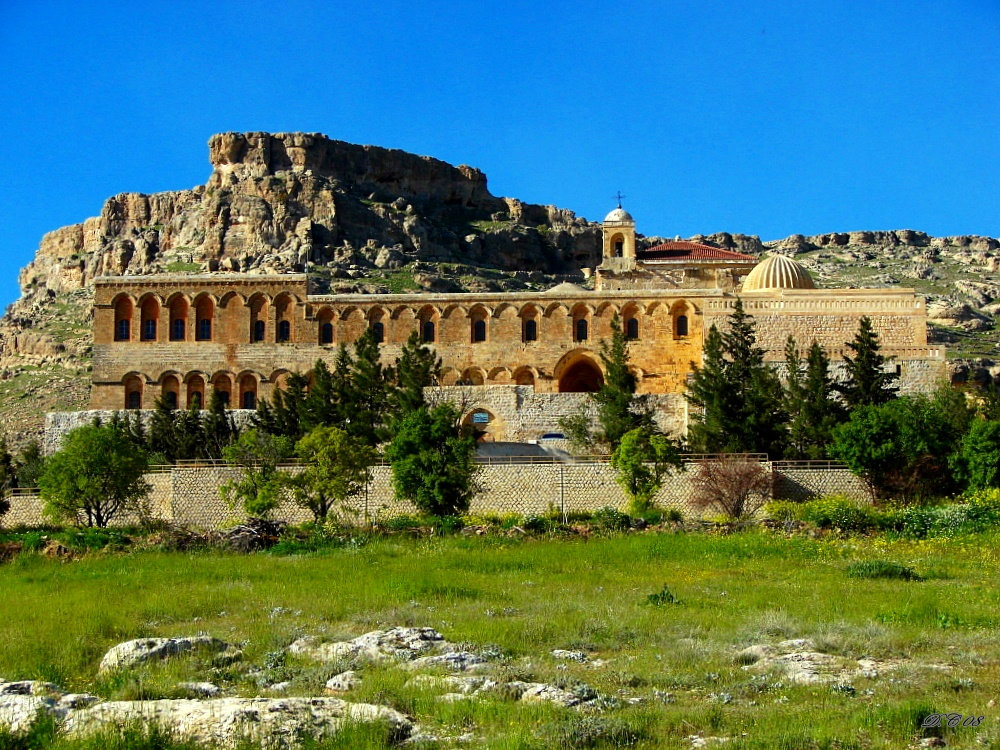
Mor Hananyo Monastery was the headquarters of the Syriac Orthodox Church of Antioch until 1932.

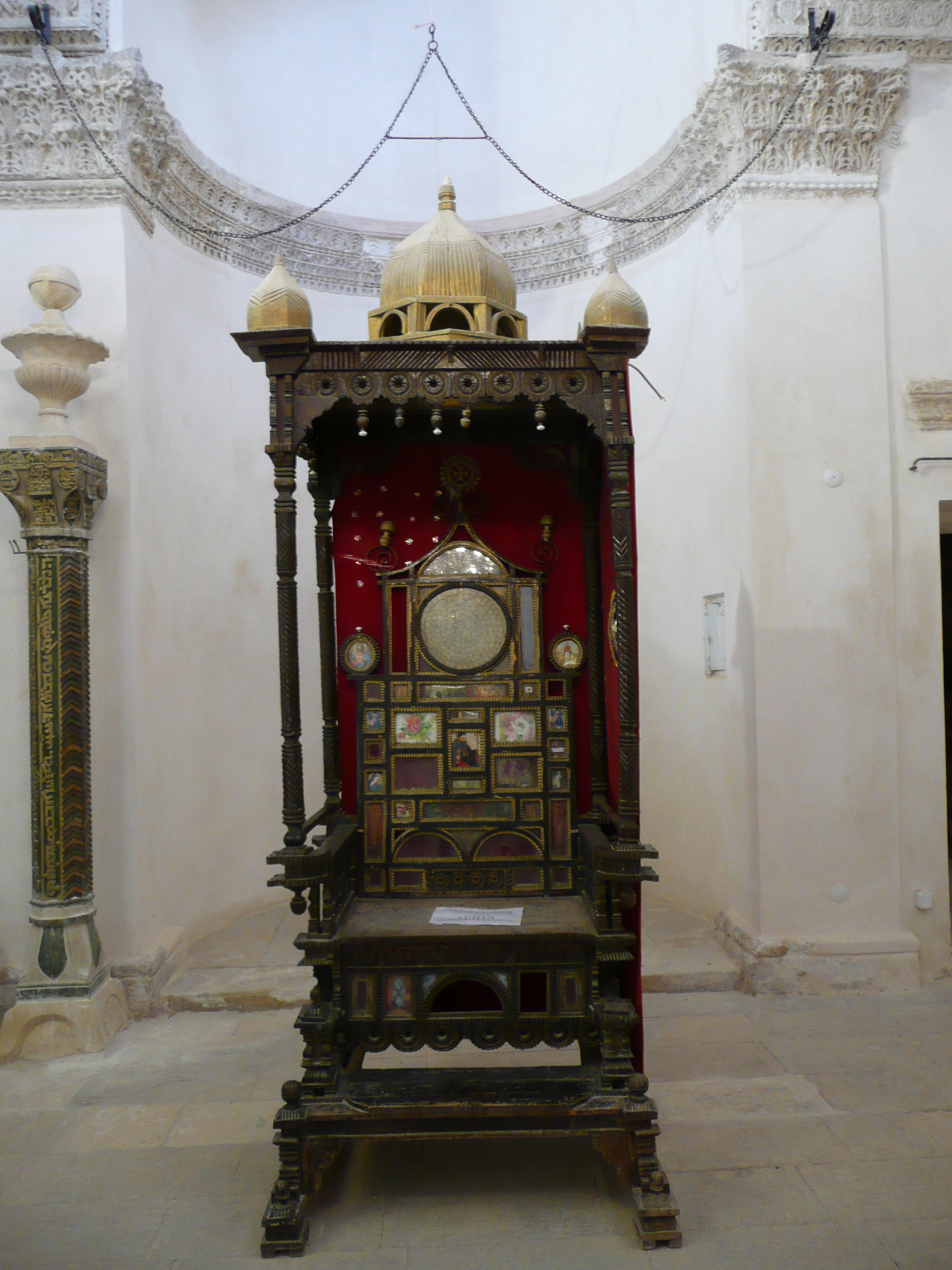
Patriarchal throne of the Syriac Patriarch of Antioch in Mor Hananyo Monastery, Turkey. It was made during the 6th century.

In 1293, the patriarchal seat was moved from the Mor Bar Sauma Monastery, where the patriarchs had resided since 1166, to the Mor Hananyo Monastery (Deyrulzafaran) in southeastern Anatolia near Mardin, where it remained until 1933 before it was re-established in Homs, Syria, due to the adverse political situation in the new Turkish Republic. As the Mongols took control of Baghdad in 1258, and declared Islam the state religion in 1294, continuous persecution was rampant against the Christian populations of cities such as Mosul and Erbil. The effect that these persecutions made it difficult to enforce ecclesiastical laws amongst church hierarchy, and made communal division more frequent among church adherents.

=== 16th–17th centuries ===
==== 16th century ====
In November 1517, the Ottoman Empire issued a firman (decree) to the Armenian Patriarchate of Jerusalem, stating that the churches, monasteries, and other institutions of the Syriac Orthodox Church were to be under their formal control, alongside those of the Ethiopian and Coptic churches. Other documents suggest that these churches were together under the authority of the Greek Orthodox Patriarchate of Antioch (Rum millet), which would become a frequent source of conflict.

Among the notable churchmen of the period, Moses of Mardin (fl. 1549; d. 1592) was a diplomat who represented the Syriac Orthodox Church in Rome during the 16th century.

==== 17th century ====
By the early 1660s, 75% of the 5,000 Syriac Orthodox people of Aleppo had converted to Catholicism after the arrival of mendicant missionaries. The Catholic missionaries sought to install a Catholic patriarch among the Jacobites and consecrated Andrew Akijan as the patriarch of the newly founded Syriac Catholic Church. The Propaganda Fide and foreign diplomats pushed for Akijan to be recognized as the Jacobite patriarch. The Porte consented and warned the Syriac Orthodox that they would be considered enemies if they refused to recognize him. Despite warnings and gifts to priests, frequent conflicts and violent disputes continued between the Catholic and Orthodox Syriacs.

In 1662, the vacant Syriac Patriarchate aligned with the Catholic Church, but after Gregory Peter VI's death in 1702, the Catholic patriarchal line temporarily lapsed. It resumed in 1782 with Michael III Jarweh, leading to the formal establishment of the Syriac Catholic Church, while the non-Catholic faction maintained its separate patriarchate.

Around 1665, many Saint Thomas Christians of Kerala, India, committed themselves in allegiance to the Syriac Orthodox Church, which established the Malankara Syrian Church. The Malankara Church, consolidated under Mar Thoma I, welcomed Gregorios Abdal Jaleel, who regularized the canonical ordination of Mar Thoma I as a native, democratically elected bishop of the Malabar Syriac Christians.

=== Early 19th – mid-20th centuries ===
In 1836, the reformation faction of the Saint Thomas Christians in India split from the Syriac Orthodox Church and formed the Mar Thoma Syrian Church. During this period, the positions of patriarch of Tur Abdin and maphrian (the latter revived in the 1960s) had come to an end following different synods.

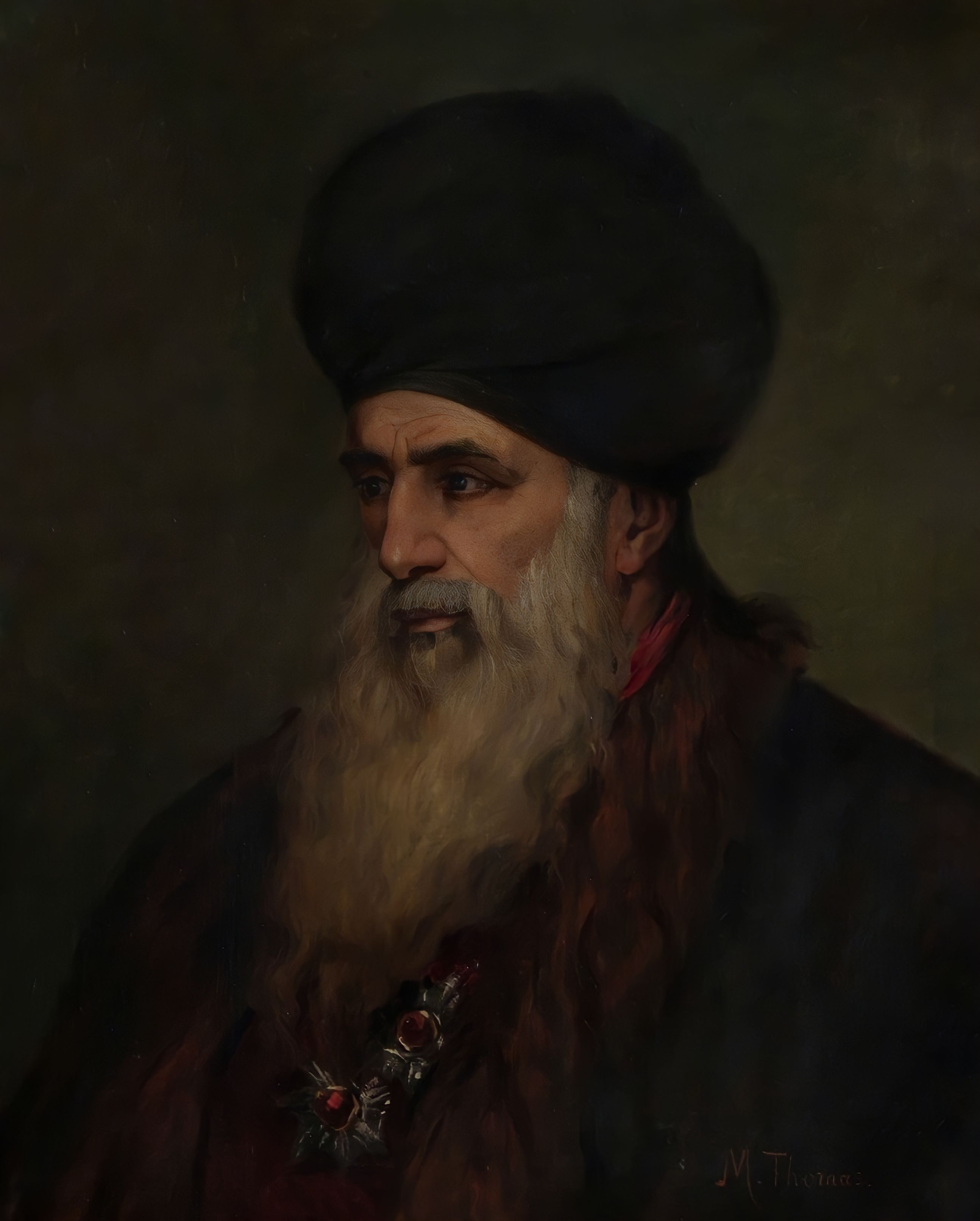
Patriarch Ignatius Peter IV

In the middle of the century, missionary efforts began with Syriac Orthodox communities in Tur Abdin, although they were not as popular as in Urmia. Students from Harput were also attracted to the schools, and influenced the community in Tur Abdin.

In the 19th century, the various Syriac Christian denominations did not view themselves as part of a single ethnic group, though intercommunity bonds within the church were strong. The church was previously under the jurisdiction of the Armenians in the Millet system of the Ottoman Empire due to both churches being non-Chalcedonian. However, following various inner church conflicts, namely a crisis in Jerusalem, a series of petitions (often numbering into the thousands) would be made by the Syriac Orthodox under Ignatius Peter IV and its dioceses for a separate millet. During the Tanzimat reforms (1839–78), the Syriac Orthodox Church was granted independent status by gaining recognition as their own millet in 1873, apart from Armenians and Greeks. However, conflicts with the Armenian millet would continue after the Syriac Orthodox Church was granted recognition.

In the late 19th century, the Syriac Orthodox community of the Middle East, primarily from the cities of Adana and Harput, formed some of the earliest modern communities in the western world, with the United States being one of their first destinations in the 1890s. Later, the first Syriac Orthodox church in the United States was built in Worcester, Massachusetts.

The 1895–96 massacres in Turkey affected the Armenian and Syriac Orthodox communities when an estimated 105,000 Christians were killed. By the end of the 19th century, 200,000 Syriac Orthodox Christians remained in the Middle East, primarily concentrated around Mor Hananyo Monastery, the patriarchal seat.

In 1870, there were 22 Syriac Orthodox settlements in the vicinity of Diyarbakır. In the 1870–71 Diyarbakır salnames, there were 1,434 Orthodox Syriacs in that city. Internal rivalry within the Syriac Orthodox Church in Tur Abdin resulted in many conversions to its Uniate branch, the Syriac Catholic Church.

On 10 December 1876, Ignatius Peter IV consecrated Geevarghese Gregorios of Parumala as metropolitan. He had also worked to reform the Indian church after a long period of neglect, convening a synod in 1876 that reorganized communities into seven dioceses and establishing two councils. Under Peter IV's patriarchate, Jules Ferrette of the Ancient British Church was allegedly consecrated into the episcopacy for establishing an Oriental Orthodox mission in the West. Joseph Rene Vilatte was also apparently consecrated as a bishop through the Malankara Church, presumably with Peter IV's blessing.

==== Genocide (1914–1918) ====
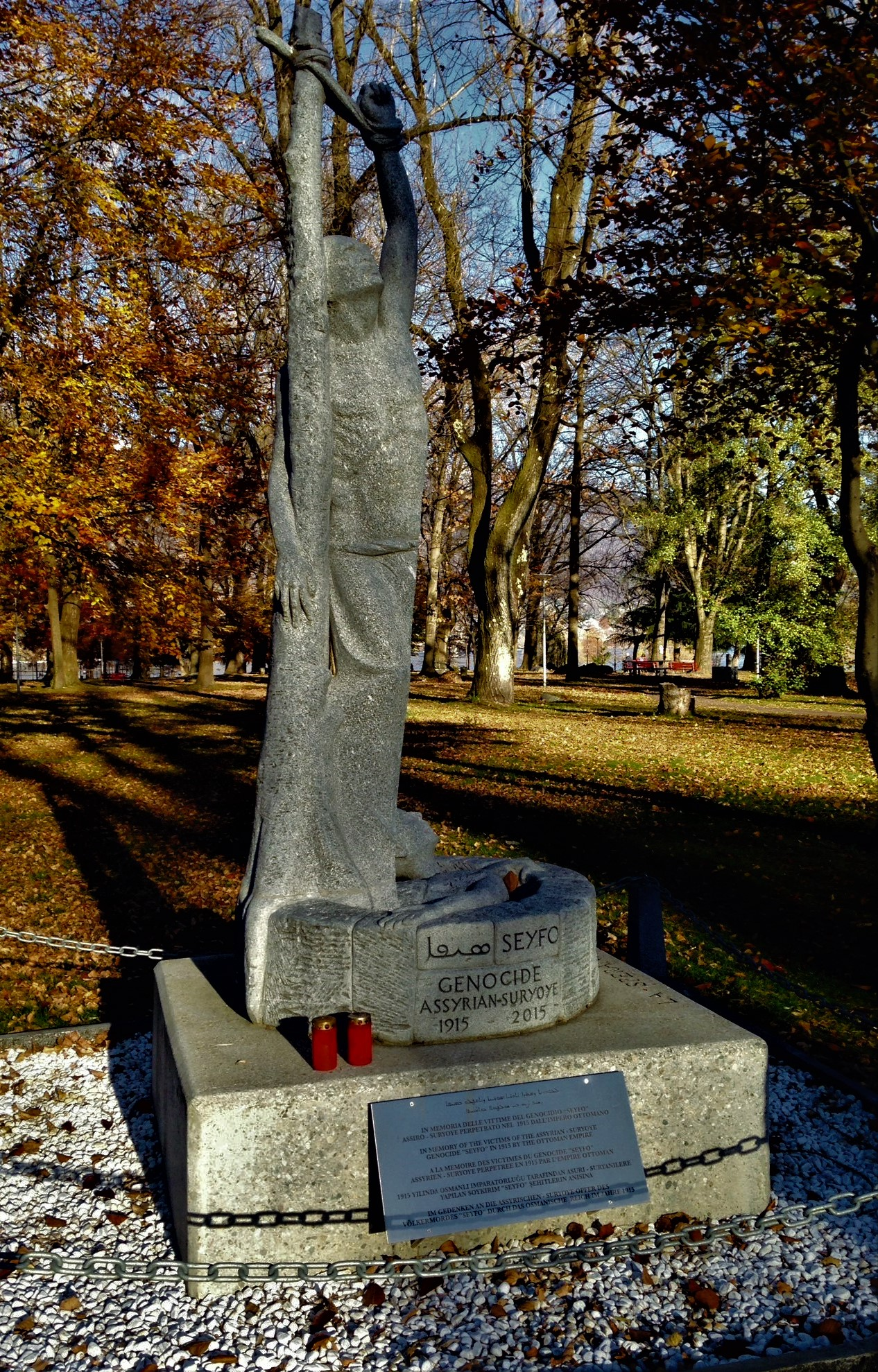
Sayfo Monument at Peace Park in Locarno, Switzerland

The Ottoman authorities killed and deported Orthodox Syriacs, then looted and seized their properties. Between 1915 and 1916, the Orthodox Syriac population in Diyarbakır province declined by 72%, and in the Mardin province by 58%. Although they were not as targeted as the Armenians, many were often killed indiscriminately, and among Syriac Christians, the Syriac Orthodox were hit the hardest by the genocide. An estimated 90,000 were killed in the massacres and ensuing deportations.

==== Interwar period ====
In 1924, the patriarchate of the church was relocated to Homs after Mustafa Kemal Atatürk expelled the Syriac Orthodox patriarch, who relocated the library of Mor Hananyo and settled in Damascus. The Syriac Orthodox villages in Tur Abdin suffered from the 1925–26 Kurdish rebellions and massive exodus to Lebanon, northern Iraq and especially Syria ensued.

In the early 1920s, the city of Qamishli was built mainly by Syriac Orthodox refugees fleeing Sayfo/the Assyrian genocide. The remaining Syriac Orthodox community in Tur Abdin did not press for minority rights by the Turkish state under the leadership of Ignatius Elias III, but in 1924/1925 he was forced to leave the country.

=== Mid 20th – early 21st centuries ===
==== 1945–2000 ====
Following Elias III's leadership, Ignatius Aphrem I ascended to the patriarchate. Under his patriarchal administration, he repudiated the clergy that claimed holy orders and apostolic succession through Ferrette and Vilatte. These clergy would later repudiate Aphrem I's notice, and form the Catholicate of the West which was dissolved and continued as the British Orthodox Church.

In 1959, the seat of the Syriac Orthodox Church was transferred to Damascus in Syria. By the 1960s, Syriac Orthodox followers began to emigrate to Sweden, with the majority of whom being from Tur Abdin. In the mid-1970s, the estimate of Syriac Orthodox living in Syria was 82,000. In 1977, the number of Syriac Orthodox followers in European dioceses was 9,700 in the Diocese of Middle Europe and 10,750 in the Diocese of Sweden and surrounding countries. Immigration to Europe increased following violence from the Kurdish-Turkish conflict, increasing the strength of Syriac Orthodox communities in their dioceses.

On 20 October 1987, Geevarghese Mar Gregorios of Parumala was declared a saint by Ignatius Zakka I Iwas, allowing additions to the diptychs.

In 2000, a synod was convened and the church officially began to use "Syriac" in its name in English, reflecting the official language of the church and to disassociate from the Syrian republic, as in English, citizens of Syria are called as Syrians. The church began the process of establishing parish councils within each diocese, and by-laws enacted by the synod at Mor Mattai Monastery were updated.

==== Syrian Civil War ====
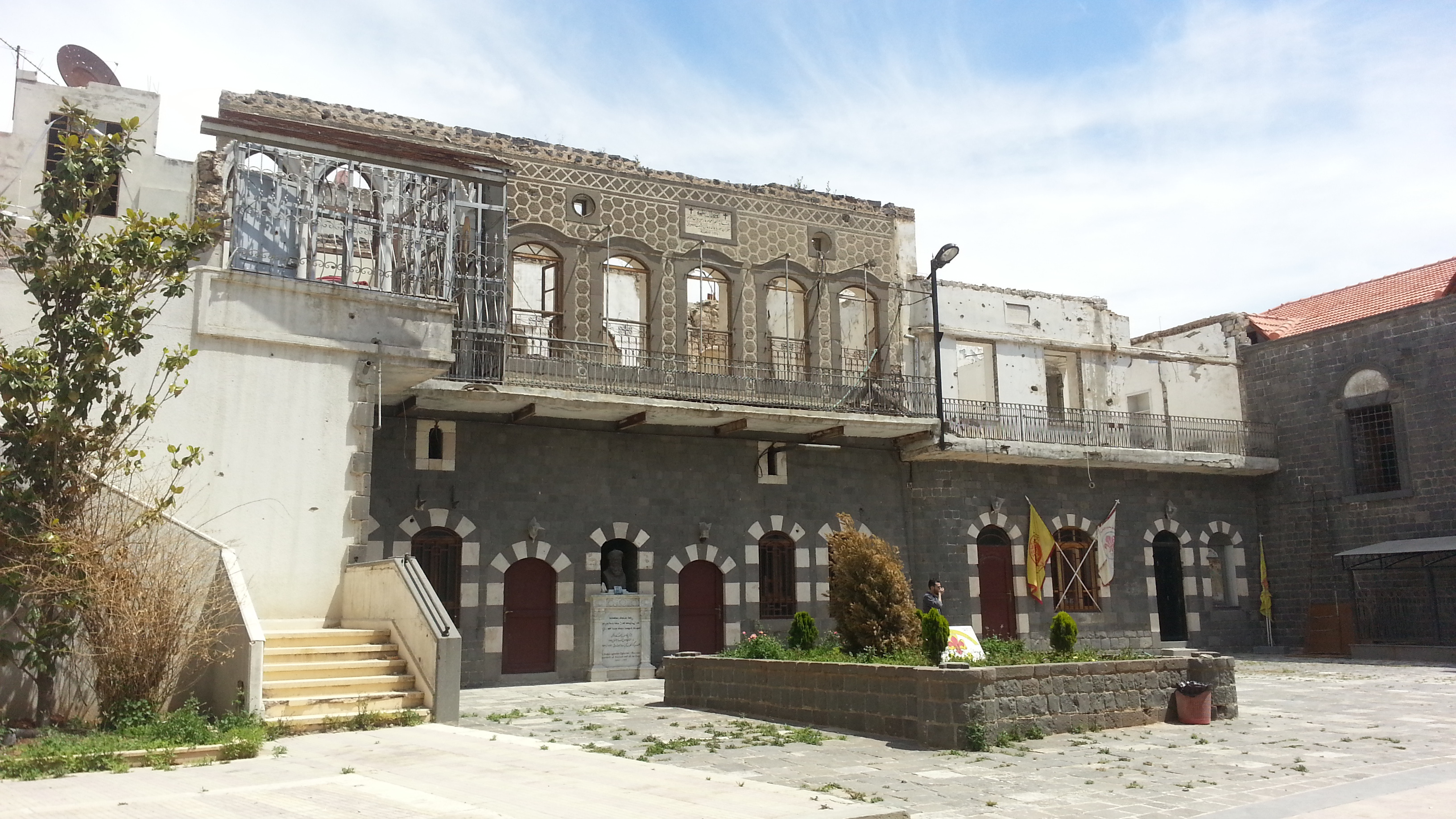
Damage to exterior of St. Mary Church of the Holy Belt during the Syrian Civil War

During the Syrian Civil War, in 2012, sources within the church reported of an "ongoing ethnic cleansing of Christians" being carried out by the Free Syrian Army. Multiple Christians claimed to have been forced out of their homes; however, one Syriac leader clarified that the reports were unconfirmed.

In another incident, Al-Arabiya reported that Assad's government forces attacked and raided the historic Syriac Orthodox Saint Mary Church of the Holy Belt in Homs; however, official church sources within Syria maintained that it was the anti-government militias that used the church as a shield and later damaged its contents on purpose. Al-Arabiya reports in 2012 stated that the Syrian government has been persecuting Christian community leaders by various means. In one instance, a Christian activist sympathetic to the opposition told the newspaper that one priest had been killed by regime forces, but later, state TV blamed the rebels for his death.

In April 2013, the Greek Orthodox and Syriac Orthodox archbishops of Aleppo, Paul Yazigi and Yohanna Ibrahim, respectively, were reportedly kidnapped near Aleppo by an armed Chechen group. Throughout the war, churches have been demolished by Turkistan Islamic Party in Syria fighters.

== Leadership ==
=== Patriarch ===
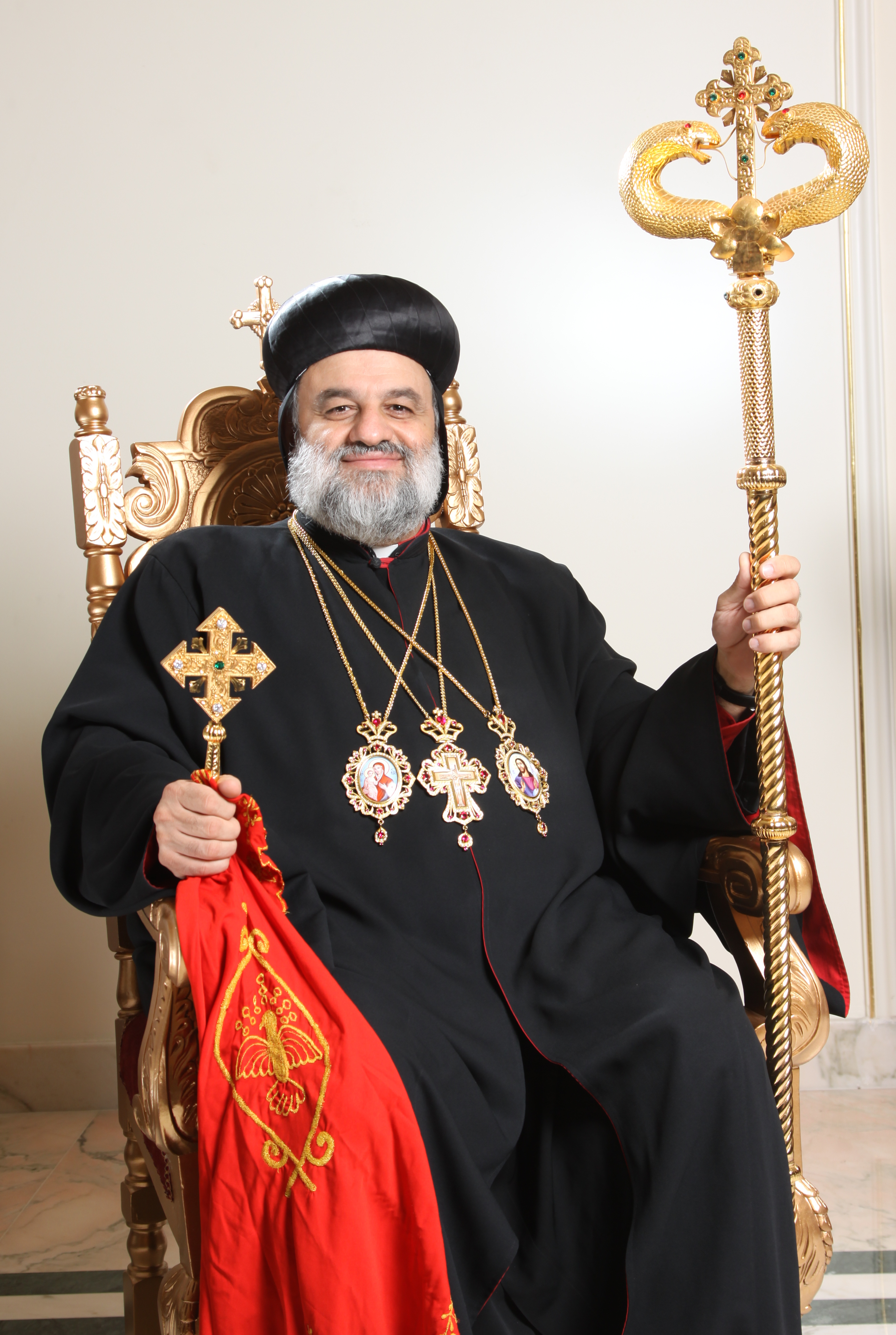
Ignatius Aphrem II, current Patriarch of Antioch

The supreme head of the Syriac Orthodox Church is titled the patriarch of Antioch, in reference to his titular claim to one of the five patriarchates of the pentarchy of Byzantine Christianity. He possesses apostolic succession through Saint Peter according to sacred tradition. Considered the "father of fathers", he must be an ordained bishop. He is the general administrator to Holy Synod and supervises the spiritual, administrative, and financial matters of the church. The patriarch oversees the church's external relations with other churches and signs documents related to church affairs such as agreements, treaties, contracts, and pastoral communiques like encyclicals (also known as bulls) and pastoral letters.

=== Maphrian or Catholicos of India ===
The word maphrian comes from the Syriac word mafriano, meaning "one who fructifies". The maphrian or Catholicos of India is the second-highest rank in the Syriac Orthodox Church after the patriarch. He is an important functionary in guiding the church when the patriarchate falls vacant after the death of a patriarch, overseeing the election of the next patriarch and leading the ceremony for the ordination of the patriarch. Their see is in India, serving as the head of the Malankara Jacobite Syrian Church, and remains under the authority of the patriarch. In joint councils, he is seated on the right side of the patriarch and heads the church's regional synod in India with the patriarch's sanction.

=== Archbishops and bishops ===
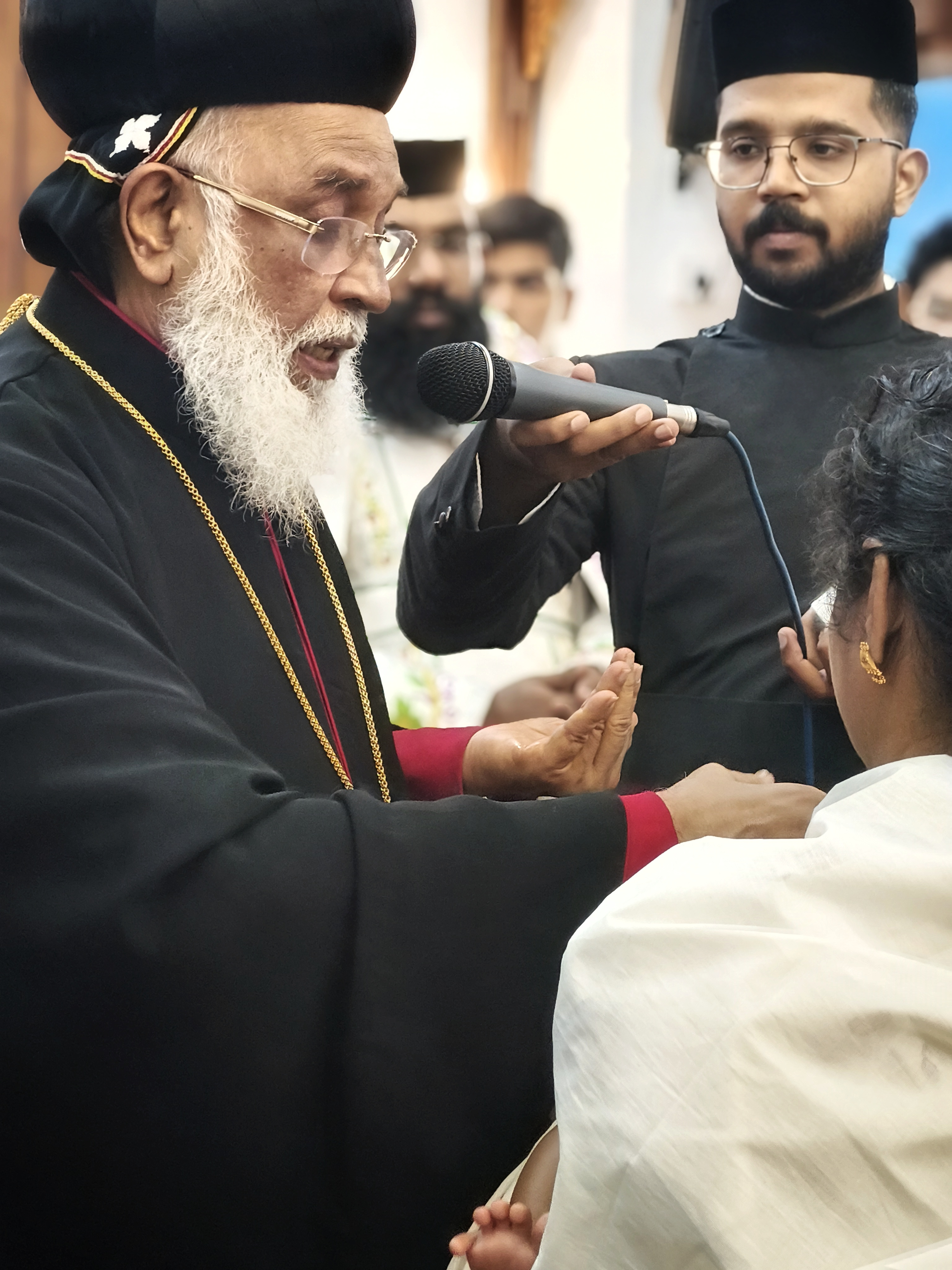
Metropolitan Thomas Mor Thimothios during the sacrament of baptism with the holy myron.

The title bishop comes from the Greek word episkopos, meaning "the one who oversees". A bishop is a spiritual leader in the church and holds different ranks. In the Syriac Orthodox Church, the hierarchy includes metropolitan bishops (or archbishops), with auxiliary bishops serving under them. The local head of an archdiocese is an archbishop. He is under the jurisdiction of the patriarch and is accountable to the Holy Synod.

=== Corepiscopos and priests ===
The priest (Kasheesho) is the one duly appointed to administer the sacraments. Unlike in the Catholic Church, Syriac deacons may marry before being ordained as priests; they cannot marry after ordained as priests.

Corepiscopi (or archpriests) are the highest honorary rank given to married priests. A corespiscopos has the privileges of being the "first among the priests". The ranks above the corepiscopos are unmarried. The title of "reesh-corepiscopos" (arch-corepiscopos) is rare and has been awarded only to Curien Kaniamparambil.

=== Deacons ===
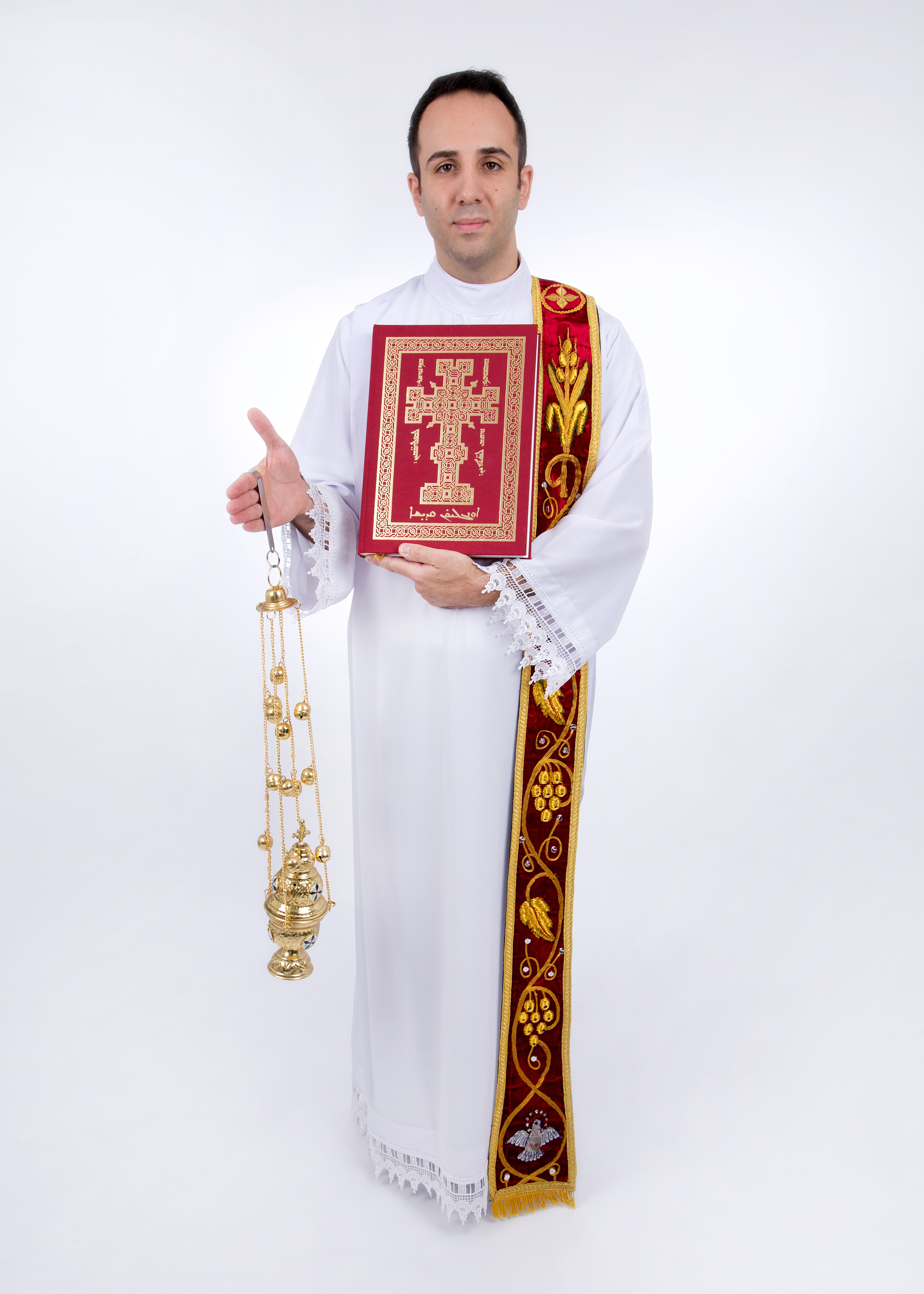
Mshamshono (full deacon) with the Orarion above the alb, a censer and the Gospel

In the Syriac Orthodox tradition, different ranks among the deacons are specifically assigned with particular duties. The seven ranks of the diaconate are:

1. Ulmoyo (Faithful)
2. Mawdyono (Confessor of faith)
3. Mzamrono (Singer)
4. Quroyo or Korooyo (Reader or Lector)
5. Afudyaqno (Subdeacon)
6. Mshamshono (Full or evangelical deacon)
7. Arkhedyaqno (Archdeacon)

The subdeacon ensures only the baptized remain in the church from the chanting of the Nicene Creed until Communion. Historically, catechumens attended the sermon but left before the Creed. The subdeacon maintains this practice and church discipline.

Only a full deacon may take the censer during the Divine Liturgy to assist the priest, but in the Jacobite Syrian Christian Church, because of the lack of deacons, altar assistants who do not have a rank of the diaconate may assist the priest. Each archdiocese may have one archdeacon who is referred to as "the right hand of the bishop". Only qualified and learned deacons are elevated to this office. Historically, in the Malankara Church, the local chief was called an archdeacon, who was the ecclesiastical authority of the Saint Thomas Christians in the Malabar region of India.

=== Deaconess ===
An ordained deaconess is entitled to enter the sanctuary only for cleaning, lighting the lamps and is limited to give Holy Communion to women and children who are under the age of five. She can read Scripture, including the Gospels, in a public gatherings. The title of deaconess can also be given to a choirgirl. Ordained deaconesses may sing in the choir. The ministry of the deaconess assists the priest and deacon outside the altar including in the service of baptizing women and anointing them with holy chrism.

== Worship ==
=== Bible ===
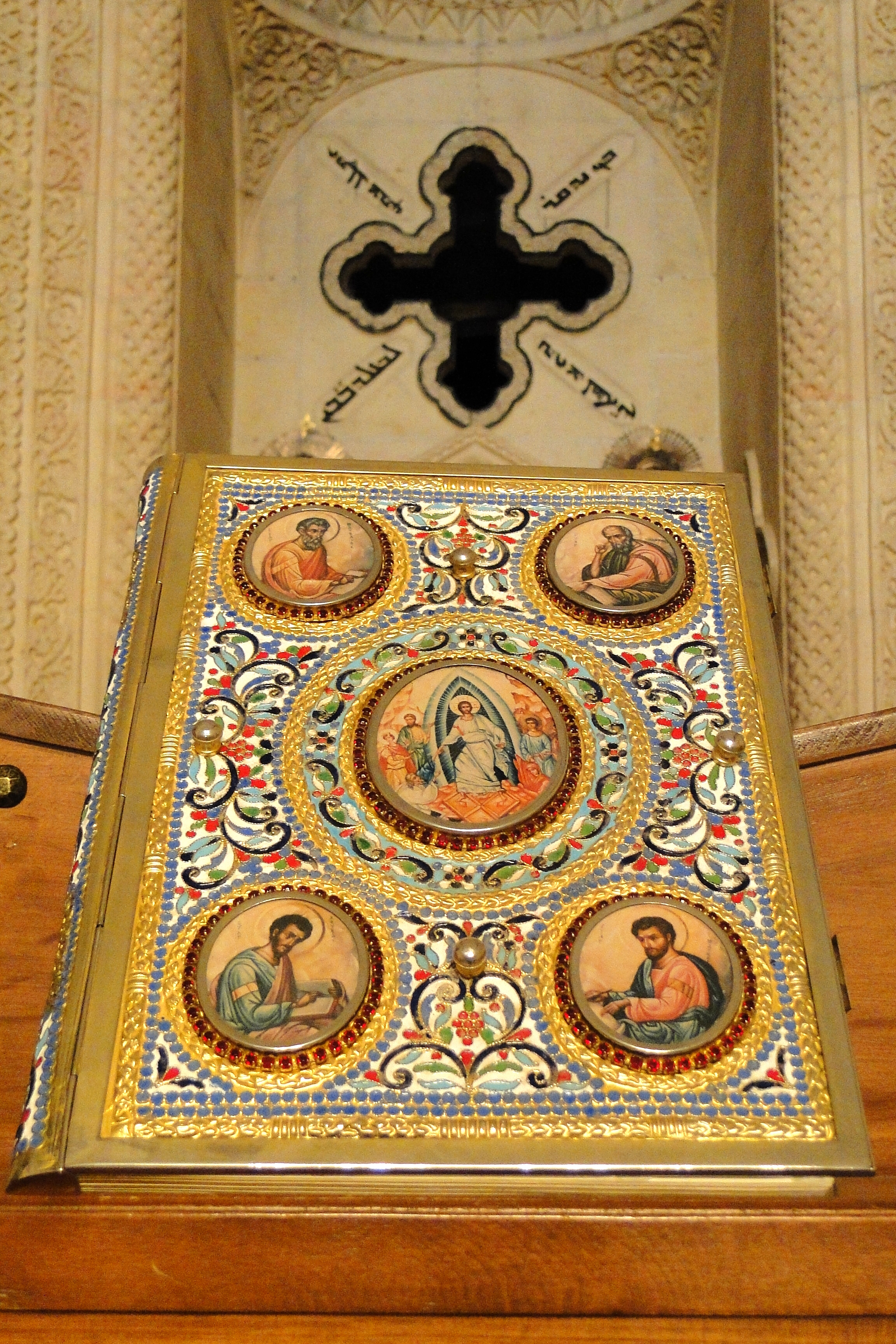
Peshitta Bible at Mor Hananyo Monastery

Syriac Orthodox churches uses the Peshitta (Syriac: ܡܦܩܬܐ ܦܫܝܛܬܐ, lit. 'simple, common') as its official Bible. The New Testament books of this Bible are estimated to have been translated from Koine Greek to Syriac between the late first century to the early third century AD. The Old Testament of the Peshitta was translated from Hebrew, probably in the second century. The New Testament of the Peshitta, which originally excluded certain disputed books, had become the standard by the early fifth century, replacing two early Syriac versions of the gospels.

In the Syriac Orthodox Church's biblical interpretation, the School of Edessa was divided over whether to accept the works of Theodore of Mopsuestia. Over the centuries, divisions among Miaphysites, Chalcedonians and other Dyophysites became more pronounced, influencing Syriac literature and leading to the compilation of new works by figures such as Dionysius bar Salibi and Bar Hebraeus.

=== Doctrine ===
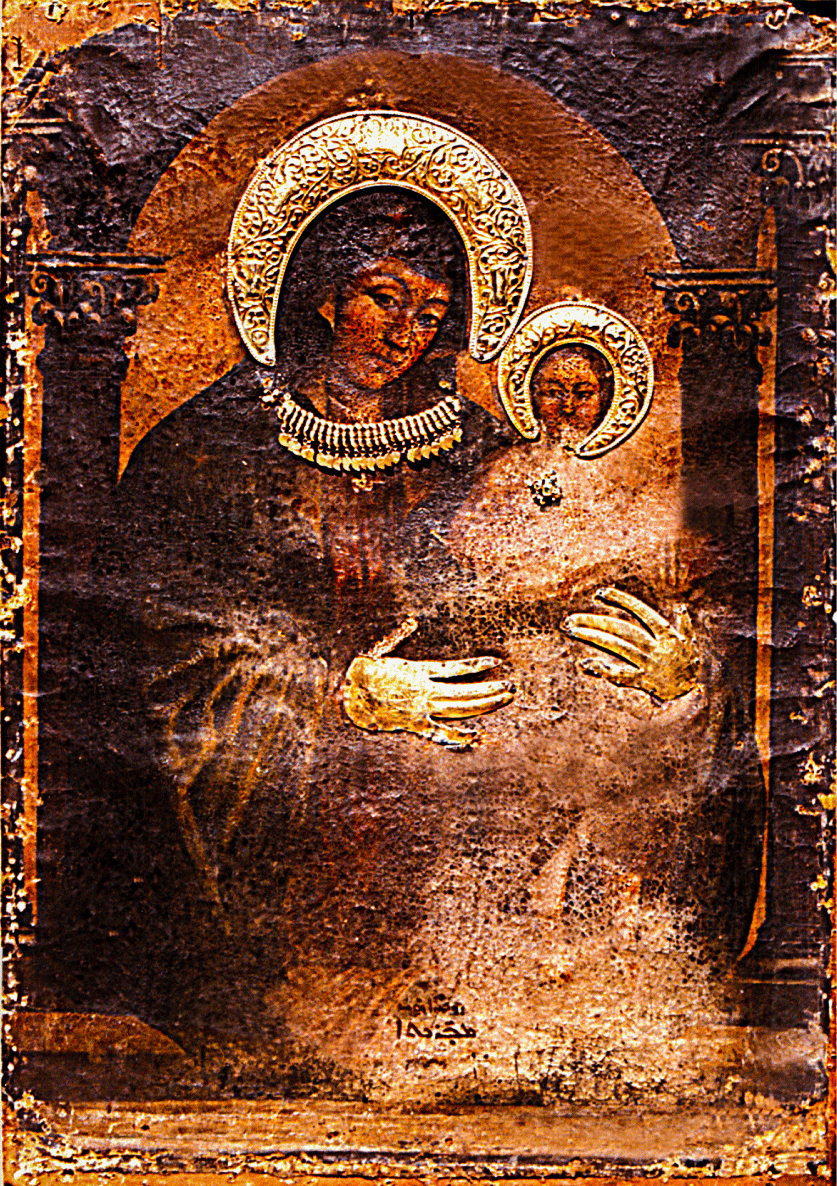
Icon of the Virgin Mary by St. Luke the Evangelist at Syriac orthodox monastery of St Mark in Jerusalem

The Syriac Orthodox Church theology is based on the Nicene Creed. The Syriac Orthodox Church teaches that it is the one, holy, catholic and apostolic Church founded by Jesus Christ in his Great Commission, that its metropolitans are the successors of Christ's apostles, and that the patriarch is the successor to Saint Peter on whom primacy was conferred by Jesus Christ. The church accepted the first three synods held at Nicaea (325), Constantinople (381), and Ephesus (431), shaping the formulation and early interpretation of Christian doctrines. The Syriac Orthodox Church is part of Oriental Orthodoxy, a distinct communion of churches claiming to continue the patristic and apostolic Christology before the schism following the Council of Chalcedon in 451. In terms of Christology, the Oriental Orthodox (non-Chalcedonian) understanding is that Christ is of "one nature—the Logos Incarnate, of the full humanity and full divinity". Just as humans are of their mothers and fathers and not in their mothers and fathers, so too is the nature of Christ according to Oriental Orthodoxy. The Chalcedonian understanding is that Christ is "in two natures, full humanity and full divinity". This is the doctrinal difference that separated the Oriental Orthodox and the Imperial Church. The church believes in the mystery of Incarnation and venerates the Virgin Mary as Theotokos or Yoldath Aloho, meaning God-bearer.

The Fathers of the Syriac Orthodox Church gave a theological interpretation to the primacy of Saint Peter. They were fully convinced of the unique office of Peter in the early Christian community. Ephrem, Aphrahat, and Maruthas unequivocally acknowledged the office of Peter. The different orders of liturgies used for sanctification of church buildings, marriages, ordinations etc., reveal that the primacy of Peter is a part of faith of the church. The church does not believe in papal primacy as understood by the Roman See; rather, Petrine primacy according to the ancient Syriac tradition. The church uses both the Julian calendar and the Gregorian calendar based on their regions and traditions they adapted.

Bar Hebraeus wrote a Nomocanon with 40 chapters detailing the rules and canons of the church, some of which were derived from other schools of thought. These writings served as a basis for the leadership of the church and were mostly unchanged for 330 years.

=== Language ===
- Syriac, as the most notable variant of Aramaic language in the Christian era, is used by the Syriac Orthodox Church in two basic forms: classical Syriac is traditionally employed as the main liturgical and literary language, while the neo-Aramaic (Neo-Syriac) dialect known as Turoyo is spoken as the most common vernacular language. Other communities, such as those in Bartella, speak a different dialect of Syriac.
- Arabic had become the dominant language of Syria, Lebanon, Palestine, and Egypt by the 11th century. Syriac Orthodox clergy wrote in Arabic using Garshūni, a Syriac script in the 15th century and later adopted the Arabic script. An English missionary in the 1840s noted that the Arabic speech of the Syriacs was intermixed with Syriac vocabulary. They chose Arabic and Muslim-sounding names, while women had Biblical names.
- Greek language was historically used (along with Syriac) in the earliest periods, during and after the separation (5th–6th centuries), but its use gradually declined.
- English is used globally alongside Syriac.
- Malayalam, Tamil, Kannada are presently used in India with Syriac.
- Suriyani Malayalam, also known as Karshoni or Syriac Malayalam, is a dialect of Malayalam written in a variant form of the Syriac alphabet which was popular among the Saint Thomas Christians (also known as Syrian Christians or Nasranis) of Kerala in India. It uses Malayalam grammar, the Maḏnḥāyā or "Eastern" Syriac script with special orthographic features, and vocabulary from Malayalam and East Syriac. This originated in the South Indian region of the Malabar Coast (modern-day Kerala). Until the 19th century, the script was widely used by Syrian Christians in Kerala.
- Spanish and some Mayan languages are presently in used along with Syriac in Guatemala and Central America
- Swedish, German, Dutch, Turkish, and Portuguese are used in their regions along with Syriac.

=== Liturgy ===
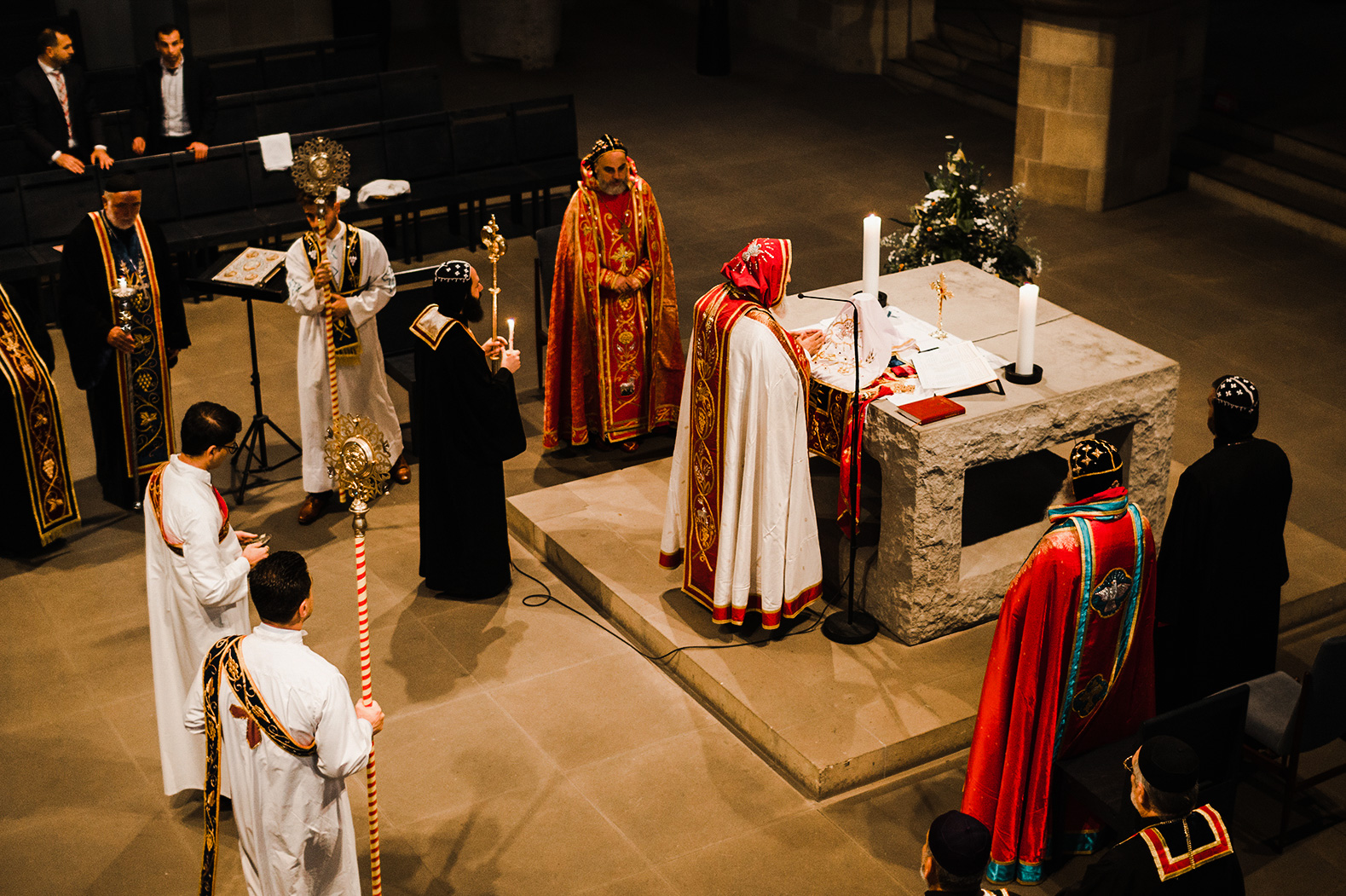
Celebration of the Liturgy at St. John's Church, Stuttgart, Germany

The liturgical service is called Holy Qurobo, meaning Eucharist, in the Syriac language. The Liturgy of Saint James is celebrated on Sundays and special occasions. The Holy Eucharist consists reading of the Gospel, Bible readings, prayers, and hymns. The recitation of the liturgy is performed according to with specific parts chanted by the presider, the lectors, the choir, and the congregated faithful, at certain times in unison. Apart from certain readings, prayers are sung in the form of chants and melodies. Hundreds of melodies remain preserved in the book known as Beth Gazo, the key reference to Syriac Orthodox Church music.

In 1983, the French ethnomusicologist Christian Poché produced audio recordings of the liturgical music of the Syriac Orthodox Church. In his liner notes for the UNESCO Anthology of Traditional Music, he described the liturgical music of communities in Antioch, Tur Abdin, Urfa, Mardin in modern Turkey, as well as in Aleppo and Qamishli in modern Syria.

=== Prayer ===
Syriac Orthodox clergy and laity follow a regimen of seven prayers a day at fixed prayer times, in accordance with Psalm 119 (cf. Shehimo). According to the Syriac tradition, an ecclesiastical day starts at sunset and the canonical hours are based on West Syriac Rite:

- Evening or Ramsho prayer (Vespers)
- Night prayer or Sootoro prayer (Compline)
- Midnight or Lilyo prayer (Matins)
- Morning or Saphro prayer (Prime or Lauds, 6 a.m.)
- Third Hour or Tloth sho'in prayer (Terce, 9 a.m.)
- Sixth Hour or sheth sho'in prayer (Sext, noon)
- Ninth Hour or Tsha' sho'in prayer (None, 3 p.m.)

=== Sacraments ===
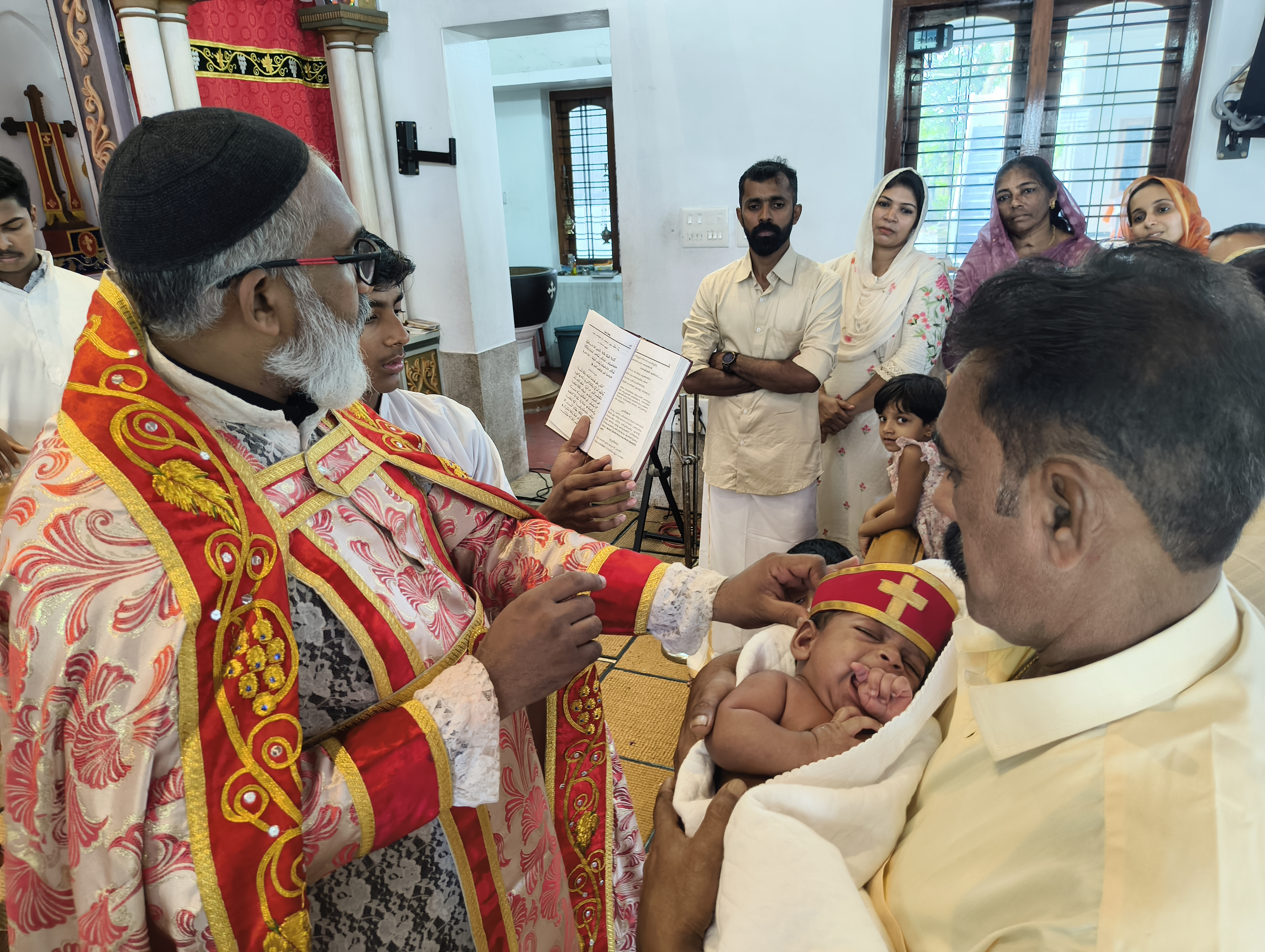
A baptism in the Jacobite Syrian Christian church in India

The seven sacraments of the church are:

- Chrismation (Anointing of Holy Muron)
- Baptism
- Confession
- Holy Communion (Queen of the Sacraments)
- Marriage
- Unction (Anointing of the Sick)
- Ordination

=== Vestments ===
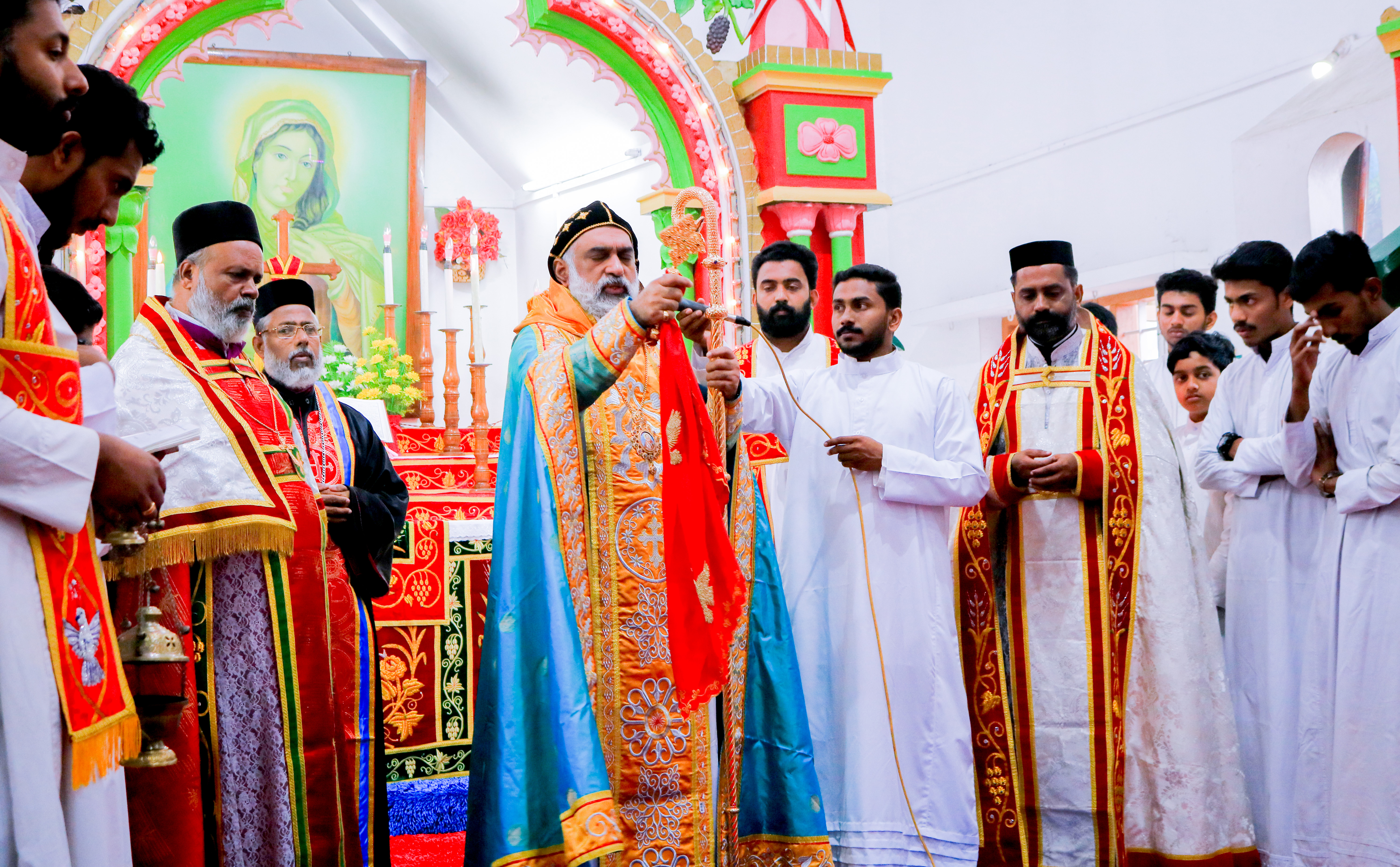
Liturgical vestments of the clergy

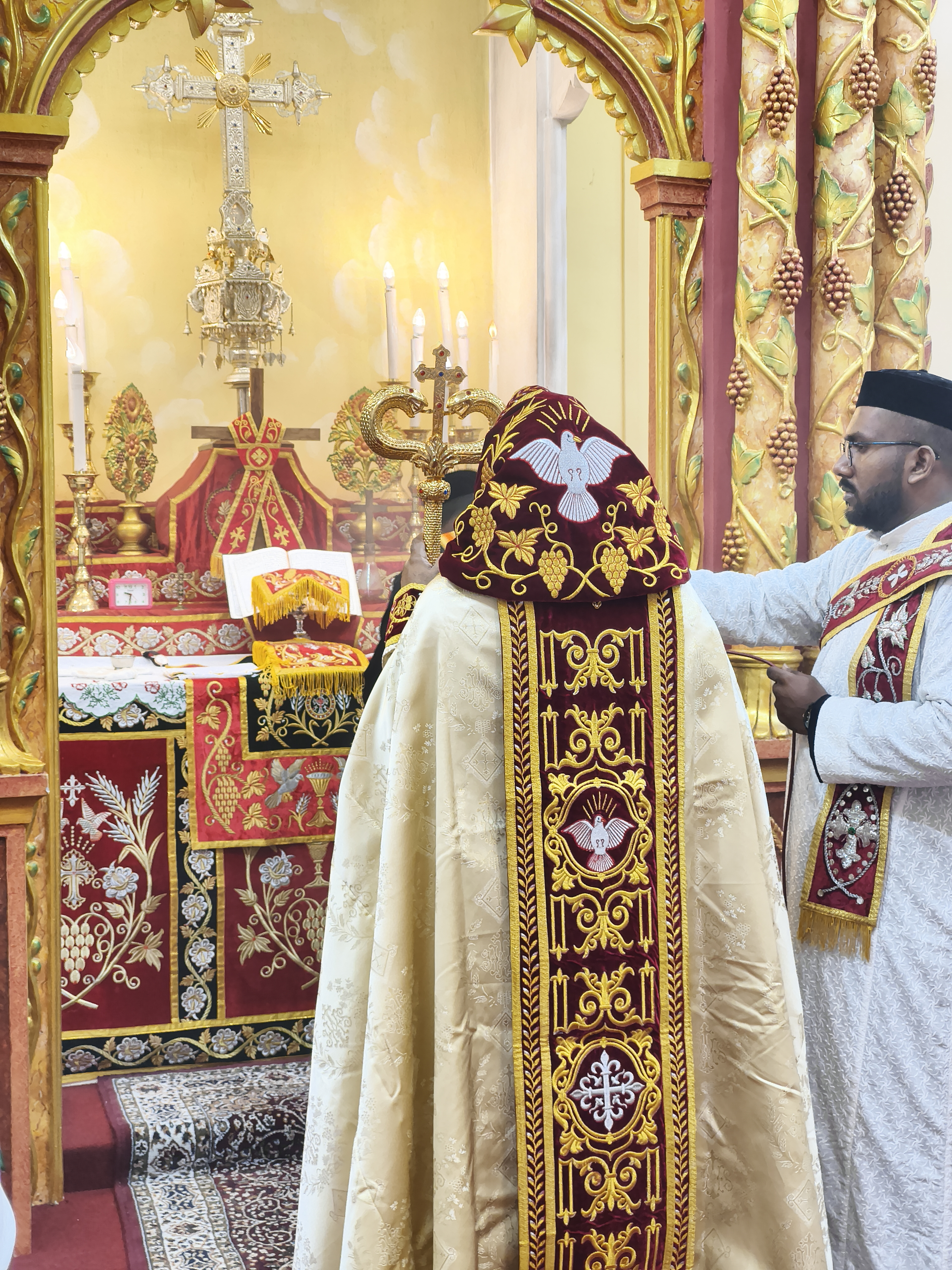
Liturgical vestments of Metropolitan Bishop and Deacon

The clergy of the Syriac Orthodox Church wear unique liturgical vestments according to their order in the priesthood, with certain elements overlapping and building upon one another.

==== Non-ceremonial ====
A priest's usual dress, worn when not performing sacraments, is a black robe. In India, due to the hot weather, priests usually wear white robes except during prayers in the church, where they wear a black robe over the white one. A priest also wears a phiro (black skullcap), which he must wear for the public prayers. A corepiscopos is given a chain with a cross and are also required to wear a black cassock and a traditional violet zoonoro (girdle) made of cloth. A ramban (monk) wears a masnapso (hood). Bishops usually wear a black or red robe along with a red belt. They also wear a qawugh (black shaped turban) and an episcopal cross on the chest.

==== Ceremonial ====
A mawdyono deacon wears a white robe called kutino, symbolizing purity. Mzamrono and ascending ranks of deacons wear the kutino and a uroro (orarion) in their respective shapes. The deaconess wears a uroro hanging down from the shoulder in the manner of an archdeacon.

Priests wear ceremonial shoes called msone. Without wearing these shoes, a priest cannot distribute the eucharist to the faithful. The priest also wears the hamniko or stole which is worn over the white robe. Then he wears a girdle called zoonoro, and zende, meaning sleeves. A cope called phayno is worn over these vestments.

If the celebrant is a bishop, he wears a veil-mitre over the masnapso. Batrashil, or pallium, is worn over the phayno by bishops and corepiscopas wear a half cope over the phayno, like the hamnikho worn by priests. They carry a crosier stylized with serpents representing the staff of Moses during liturgy and in public. They also carry a cross and scarf along with the crosier.

== Demography ==
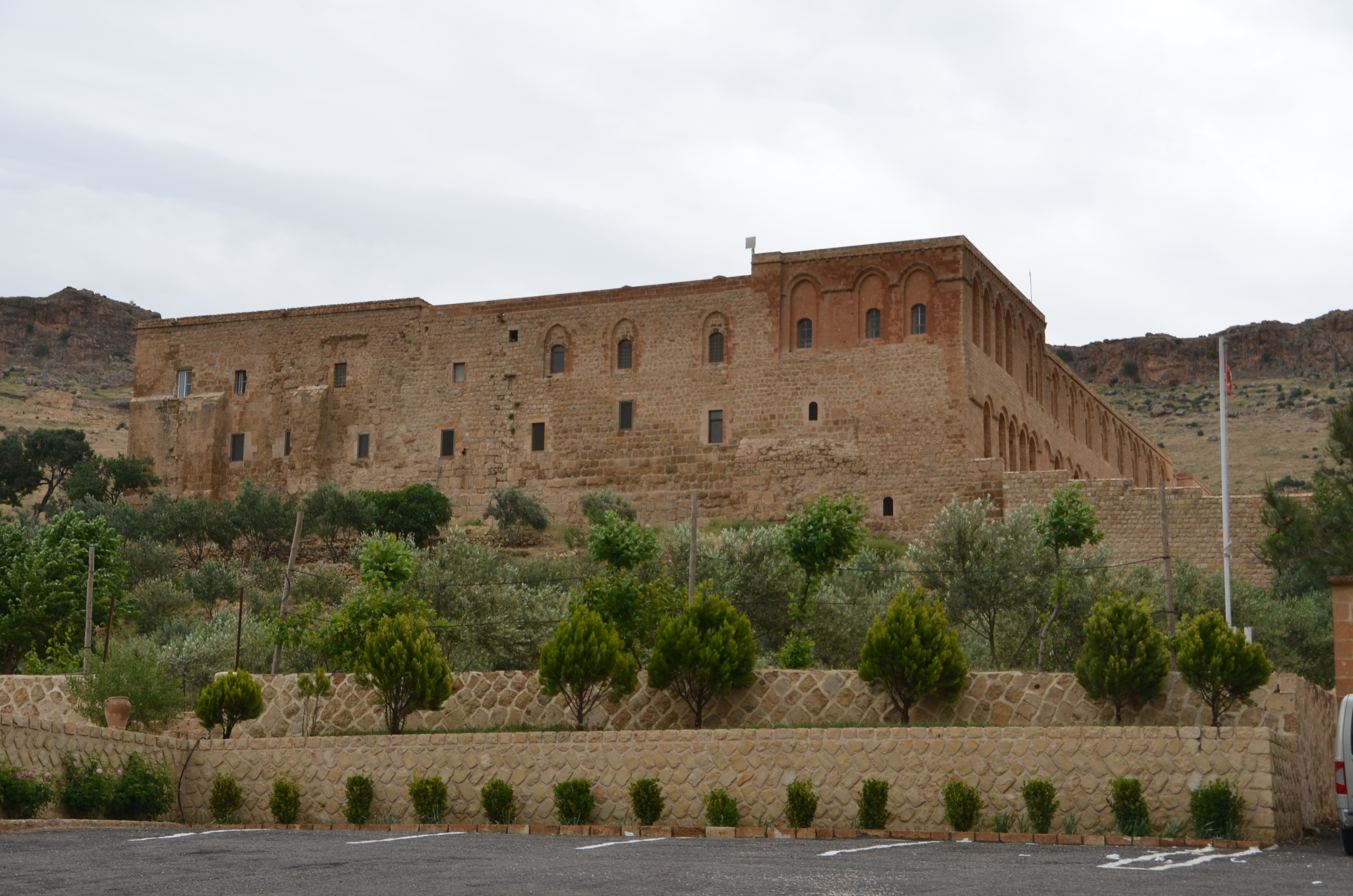
Mor Hananyo Monastery, former headquarters of the Syriac Orthodox church, in Turkey

The patriarchate was originally established in Antioch (in present-day Syria, Turkey, and Iraq) but later relocated due to persecutions by the Romans, followed by Muslim Arab rule. It was based at Mor Hananyo Monastery, Mardin, within the Ottoman Empire from 1160 to 1933, then moved to Homs from 1933 to 1959, and has been seated in Damascus, Syria, since 1959. A diaspora has also spread from the Levant, Iraq, and Turkey throughout the world, notably in Sweden, Germany, the United Kingdom, Netherlands, Austria, France, United States, Canada, Guatemala, Argentina, Brazil, Australia, and New Zealand.

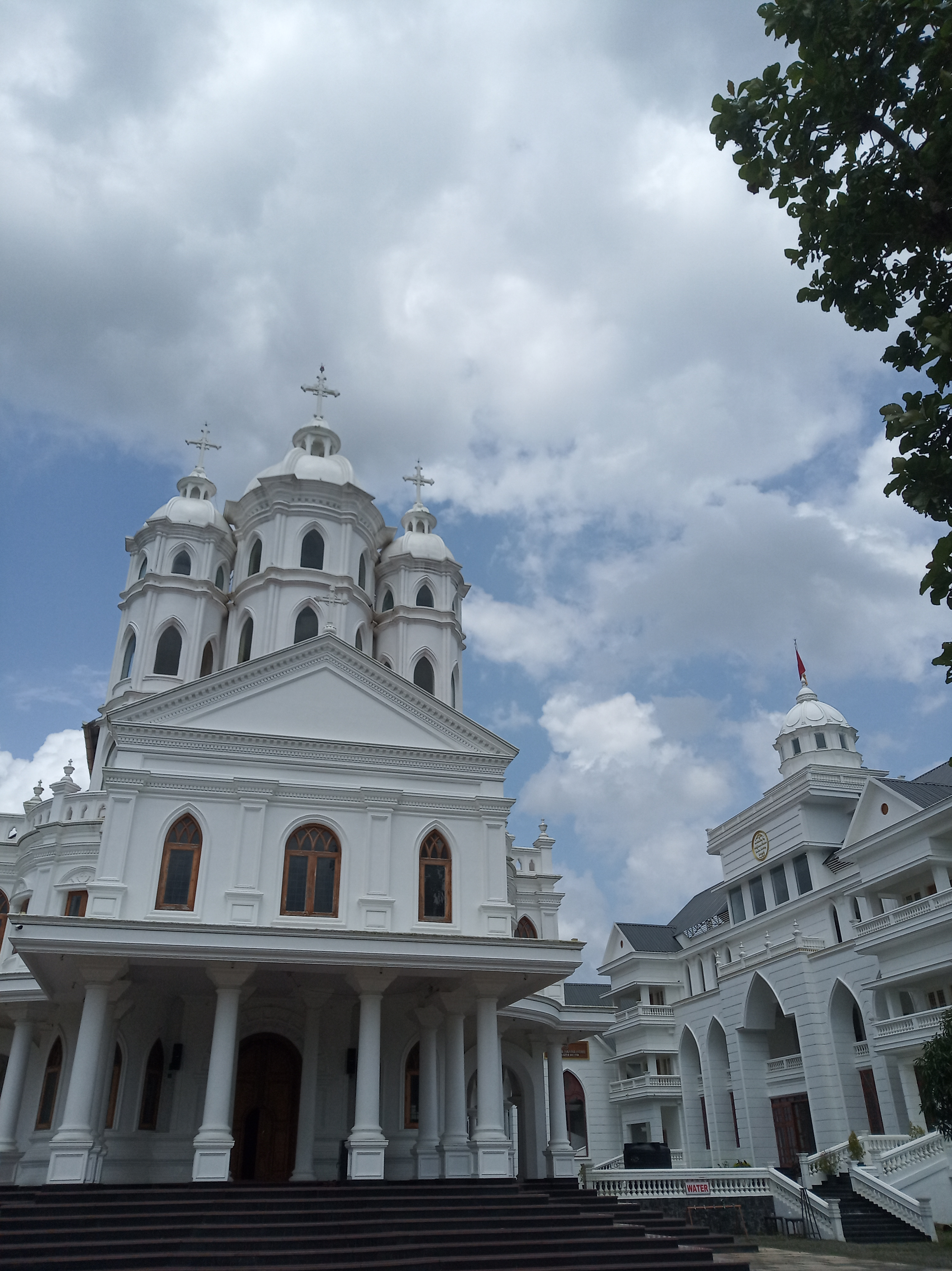
St. George's Monastery, Malekurish, India

It is estimated that the church has 600,000 Syriac adherents, in addition to 483,000 members of the Jacobite Syrian Christian Church and their own ethnic diaspora in India. There is also a large Syriac community among Mayan converts in Guatemala and South America numbering up to 500,000. According to scholar James Minahan, around 26% of the Assyrian people belong to the Syriac Orthodox Church. Although the population of Syriac Orthodox in Tur Abdin still remains in the low thousands (2,000 as of 2011), the Syriac population in Turkey is growing due to refugees from Syria and Iraq fleeing ISIS, as well as members of the diaspora returning to rebuild their homes after leaving during the Turkey–PKK conflict (1978). The village of Elbeğendi in Midyat has been repopulated by Syriacs from Germany and Switzerland.

There are approximately 250,000 members in the United States, 120,000 in Sweden, 120,000 in Germany, 15,000 in the Netherlands and 200,000 members in Brazil, Switzerland and Austria.

== Jurisdiction of the patriarchate ==
The Syriac Orthodox Church of Antioch originally covered the whole region of the Middle East and India. In recent centuries, its parishioners started to emigrate to other countries all over the world. Today, the Syriac Orthodox Church has several archdioceses and patriarchal vicariates (exarchates) in many countries, covering six continents. The church's members are divided into 26 archdioceses and 13 patriarchal vicariates.

=== Americas ===
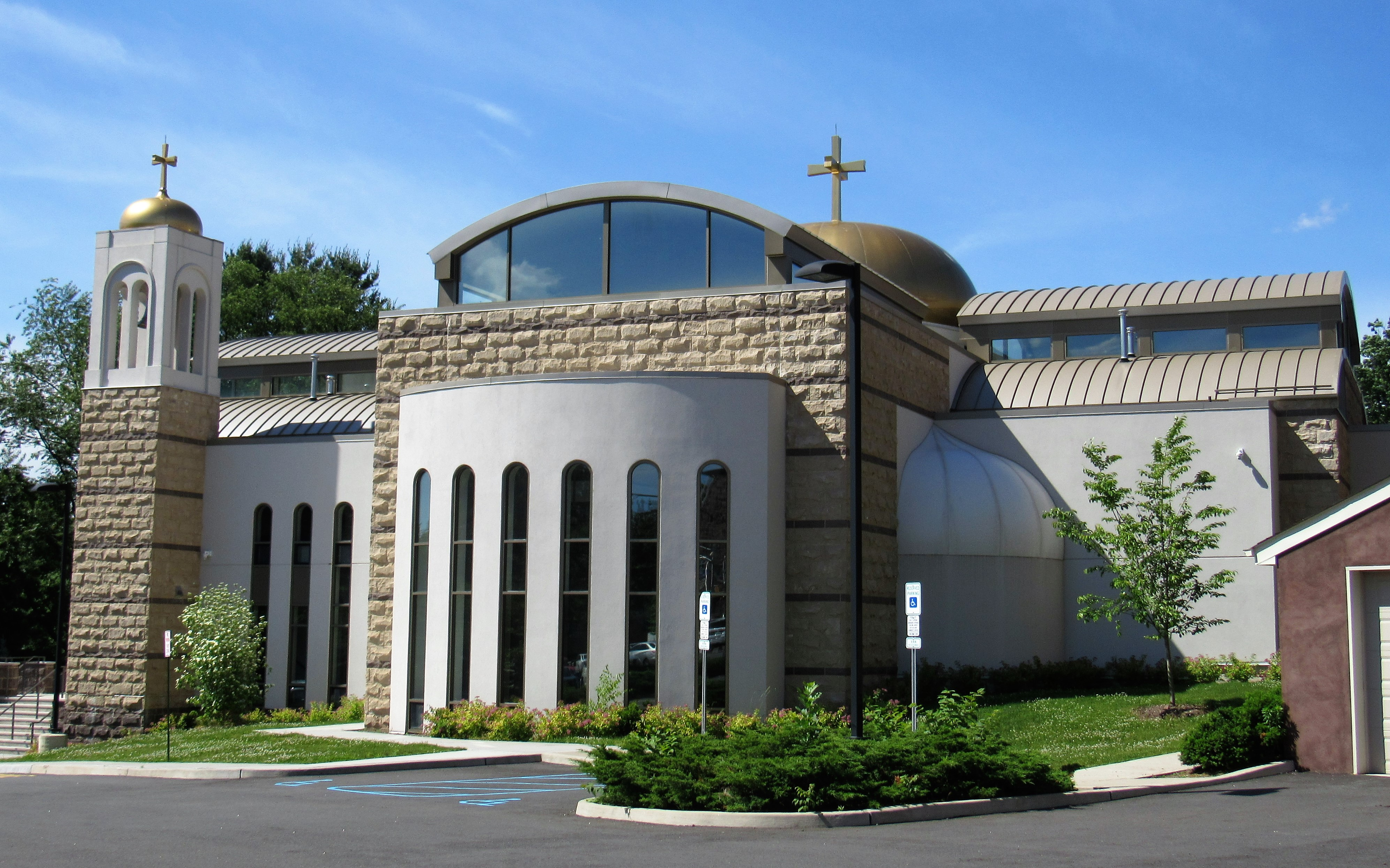
St. Mark's Cathedral, Paramus, New Jersey

The presence of the Syrian Orthodox faithful in the Americas dates back to the late 19th century.

==== North America ====
In 1952, the Patriarchal Vicariate for the U.S. and Canada was created, and in 1995, it was divided into three regional vicariates: Eastern America, Western America and Canada. In 1993, Ignatius Zakka I formed the Malankara Archdiocese of North America for the Indian adherents living in North America. The archdiocese is under the jurisdiction of the patriarchal see.

There are approximately 250,000 members of the three vicariates and more than 1,000,000 members in the Malankara Archdiocese as of 2002.

Region	Diocese or Vicariate	Metropolitan
United States	Patriarchal Vicariate of Eastern United States	Dionysius Jean Kawak
United States	Patriarchal Vicariate of Western United States	Clemis Eugene Kaplan
Canada	Patriarchal Vicariate of Canada	Athanasius Elia Bahi
United States and Canada	Malankara Archdiocese of North America	Titus Yeldho

==== Central America ====
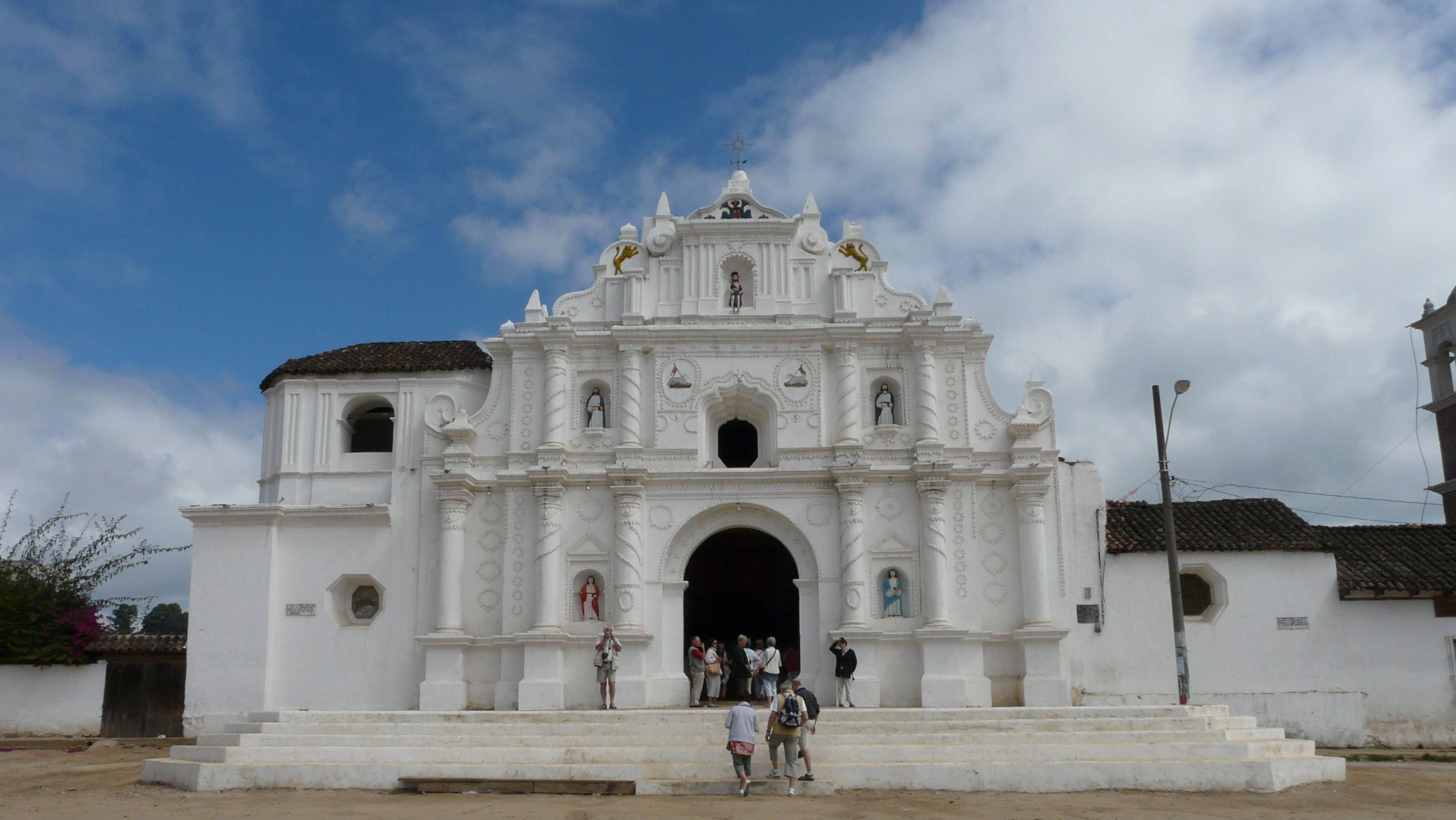
Syriac Orthodox Basilica of St. John the Baptist, Guatemala

In Guatemala, a Charismatic movement emerged in 2003 and was excommunicated in 2006 by the Roman Catholic Church. They later joined the Syriac Orthodox Church in 2013 as the Syriac Orthodox Church in Guatemala. Members of this archdiocese are generally Mayan in origin and most live in rural areas. They number around 500,000 based on church estimations. In 2013, the Standing Conference of Oriental Orthodox churches stated that the church received into communion 600,000–800,000 members from an independent Roman Catholic body. This archdiocese is known as the Archdiocese of Central America, the Caribbean Islands and Venezuela.

==== South America ====
Region	Vicariate	Metropolitan
Argentina	Patriarchal Vicariate of Argentina	Chrysostomos John Ghassali
Brazil	Patriarchal Vicariate of Brazil	Severius Malke Mourad

=== Middle East ===
The Syriac Orthodox Church in the Middle East and diaspora communities originating from there, numbering between 150,000 and 200,000 people, reside in their indigenous area of habitation in Syria, Iraq and Turkey according to estimates. The community formed and developed in the Middle Ages. The Syriac Orthodox Christians of the Middle East speak Aramaic. The Syriac Orthodox Church has numerous monasteries in the region.

Region	Diocese or vicariate	Metropolitan
Iraq	Archdiocese of Baghdad and Basra	Severius Hawa
Iraq	Archdiocese of Mar Matta	Timotheos Mousa A. Shamani
Iraq	Archdiocese of Mosul and Environs	Nicodemus Daoud Sharaf
Jerusalem and Jordan	Patriarchal Vicariate of Jerusalem and Jordan	Raban Gabriel Dahho
Lebanon	Archdiocese of Beirut	Clemis Daniel Malak Kourieh
Lebanon	Archdiocese of Mount Lebanon	Theophilus Georges Saliba
Lebanon	Patriarchal Vicariate of Zahle	Justinos Boulos Safar
Syria	Archdiocese of Aleppo	Gregorios Yohanna Ibrahim
Syria	Archdiocese of Homs & Hama	Timotheos Matta Al-Khoury
Syria	Archdiocese of Jazireh & Euphrates	Maurice Amish
Turkey	Patriarchal Vicariate of Istanbul & Ankara	Filüksinos Yusuf Çetin
Turkey	Archdiocese of Mardin	Filüksinos Saliba Özmen
Turkey	Archdiocese of Turabdin	Timotheus Samuel Aktaş
Turkey	Patriarchal Vicariate of Adiyaman	Gregorius Melki Ürek
Arabian Gulf and Emirates	Patriarchal Vicariate of Arabian Gulf	Barthelmaus Nathanael Youssef

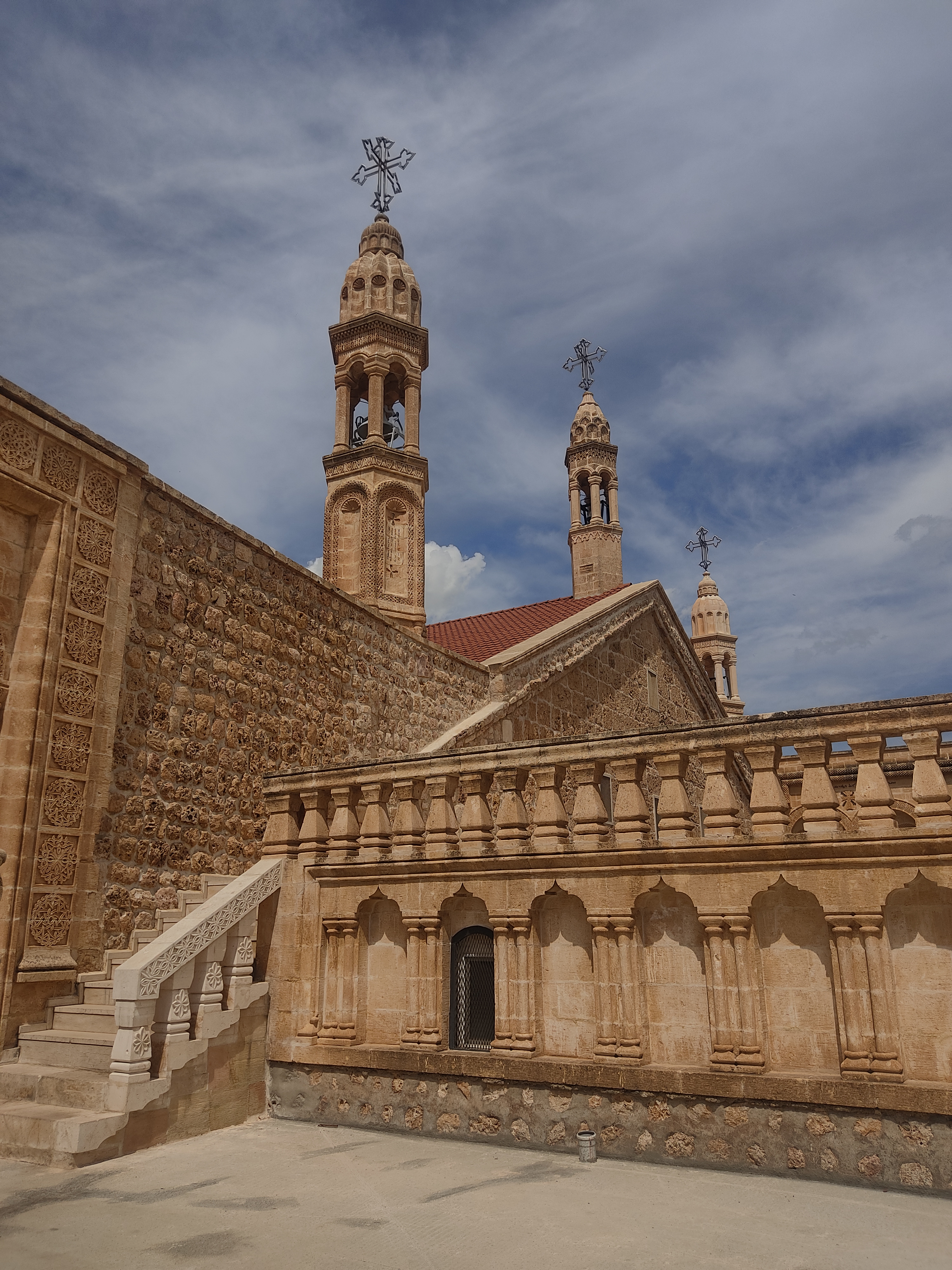
Mor Gabriel Monastery, Tur Abdin, Turkey

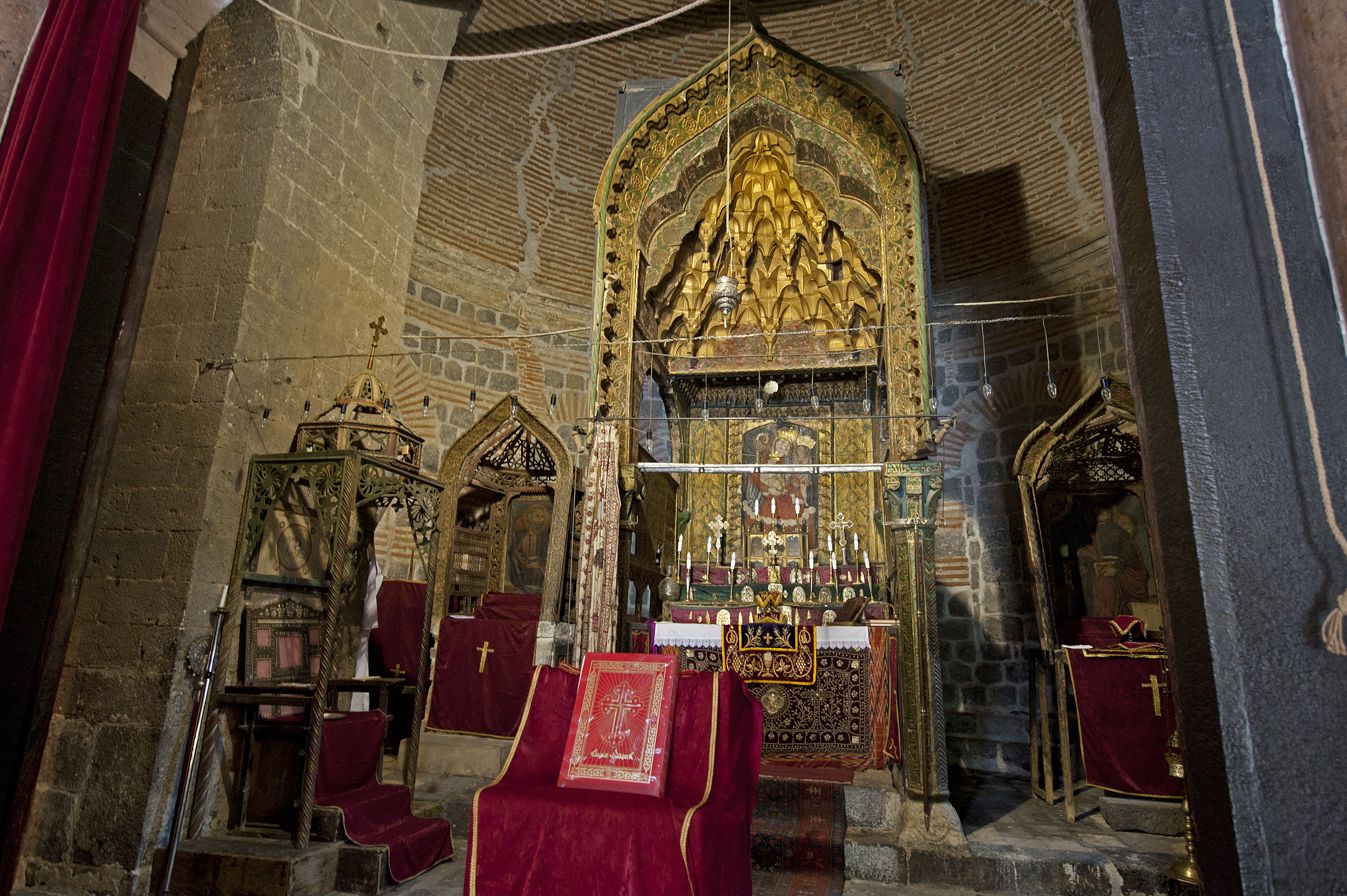
St. Mary Church, Diyarbakır, Turkey

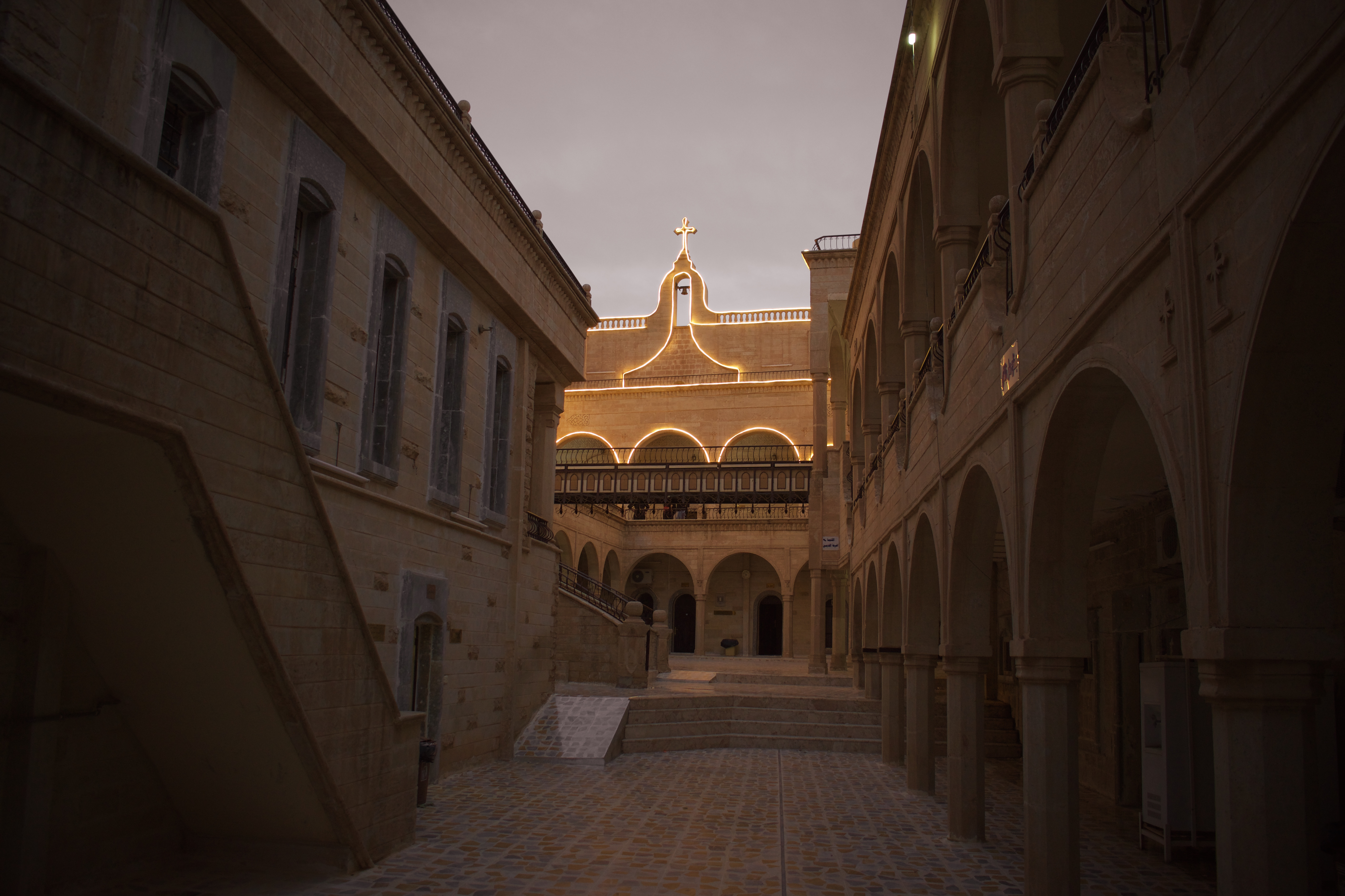
Mor Mattai Monastery, Iraq

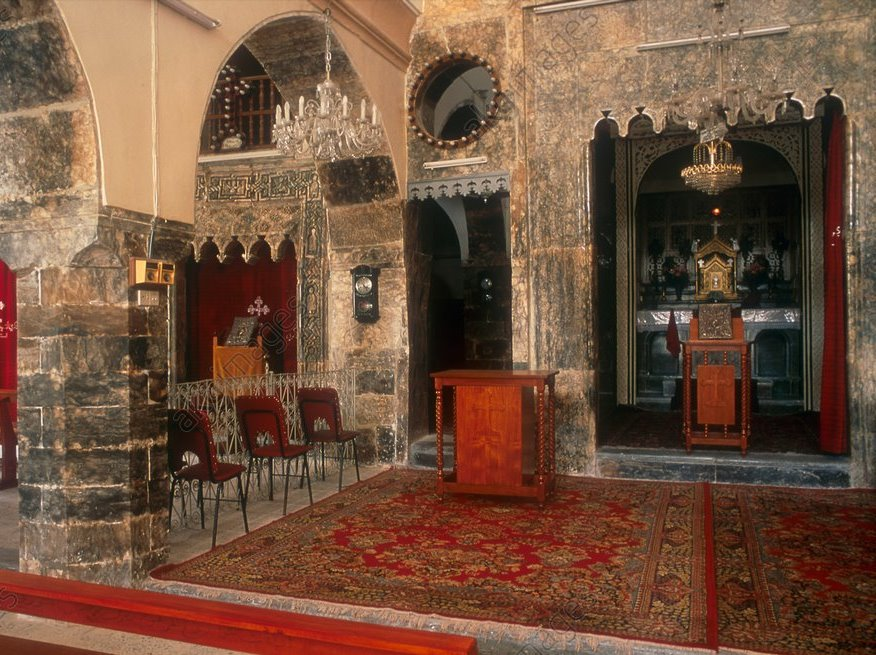
Church of Saint Thomas, Mosul, Iraq

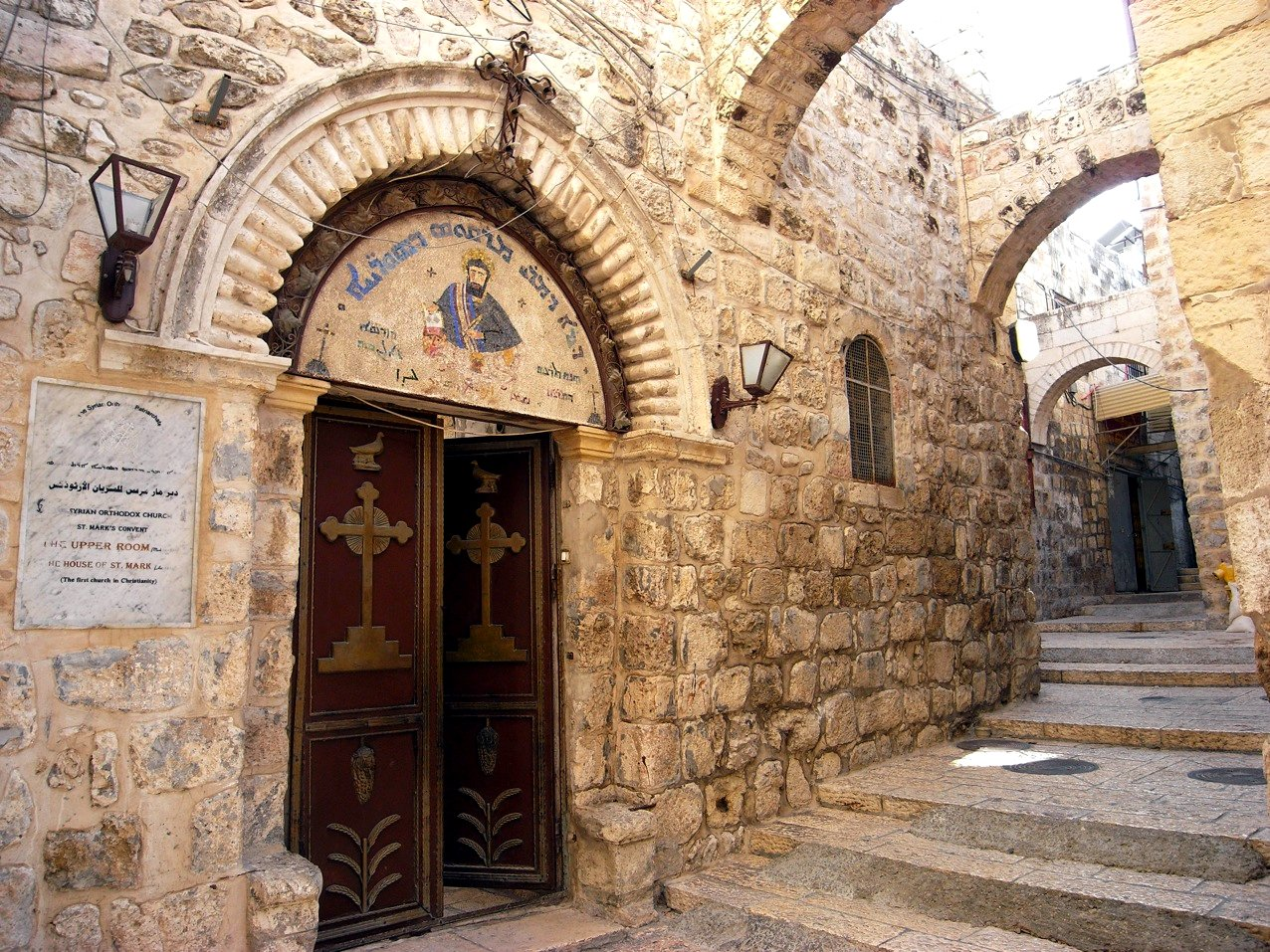
Monastery of Saint Mark, Jerusalem

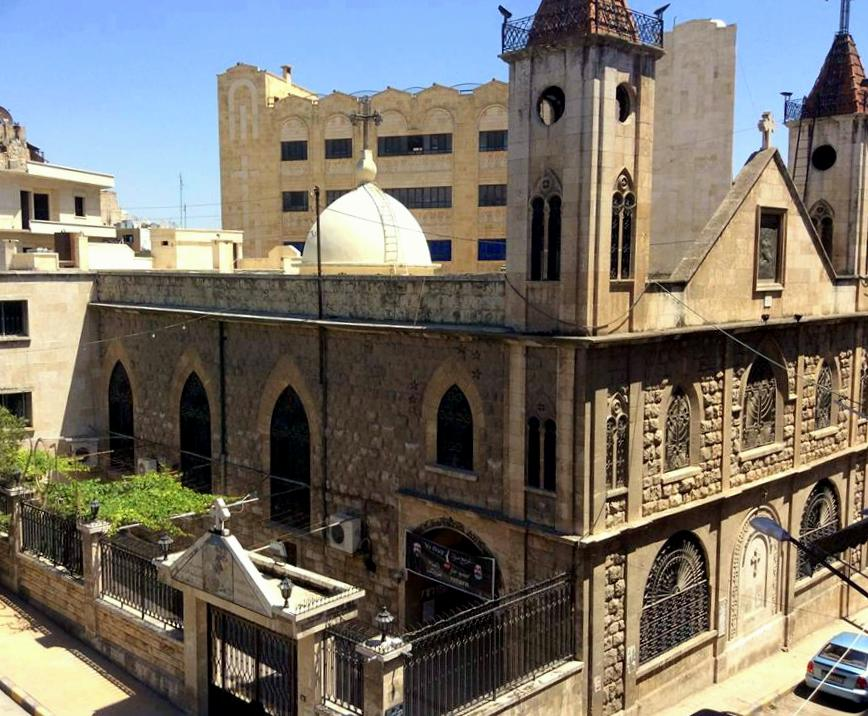
Saint George the Martyr's Church, Aleppo, Syria

=== India ===
==== Jacobite Syrian Christian Church ====
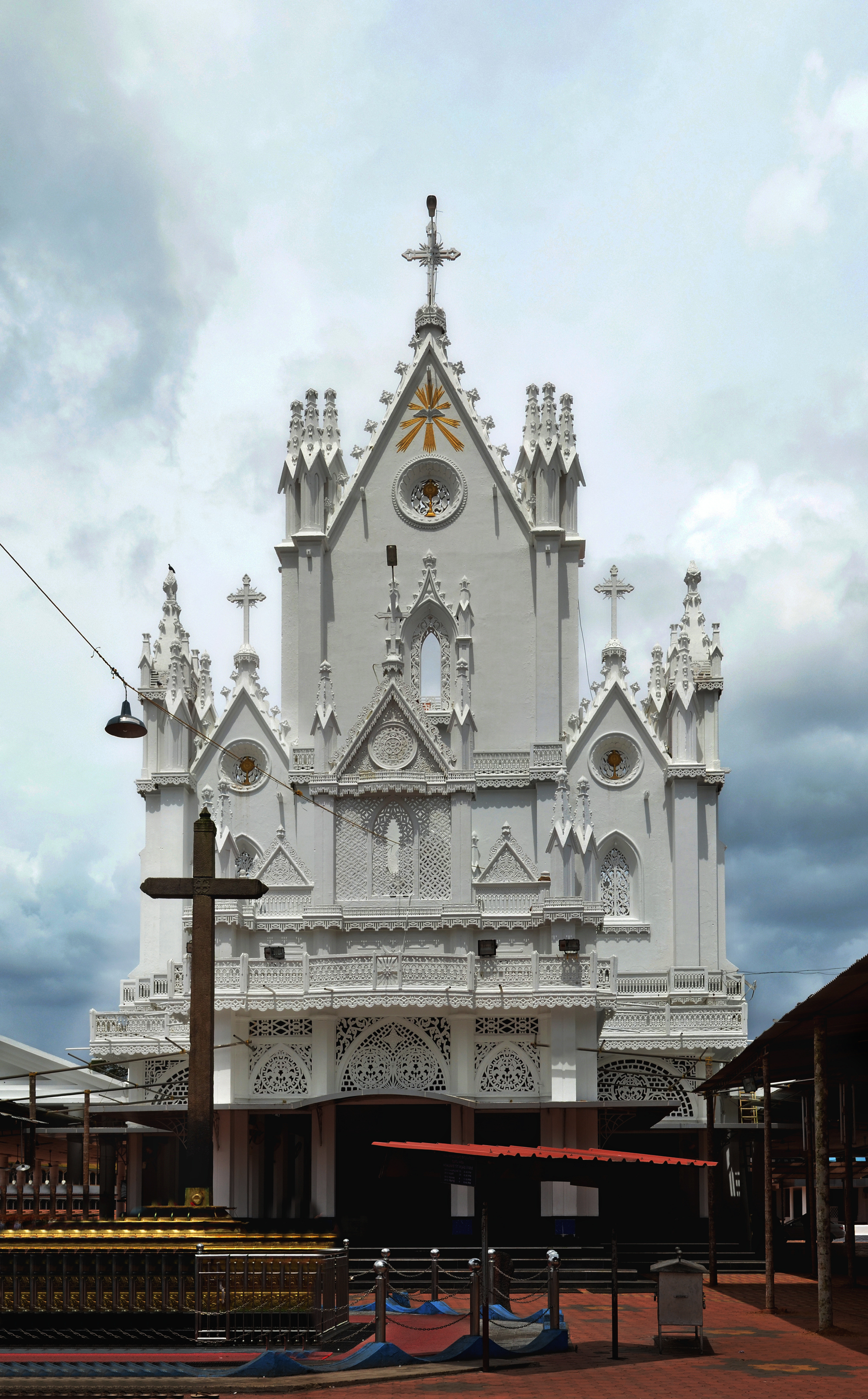
St. Mary's Cathedral, Manarcad

The Jacobite Syrian Christian Church, a maphrianate, is one of the Saint Thomas Christian churches in India. It is an integral part of the Syriac Orthodox Church, with the patriarch of Antioch serving as its supreme head. The local head of the church in Malankara (Kerala) is Baselios Joseph, ordained by Patriarch Ignatius Aphrem II in March 2025. The headquarters of the church in India is at Puthencruz, Ernakulam, Kerala in South India. Simhasana churches and the Honavar Mission is under the direct control of the patriarch.

Historically, the St. Thomas Christians were part of the Church of the East, based in Persia which was under the patriarch of Antioch. After the Council of Seleucia-Ctesiphon, which formalized the schism between the Church of the East and the Syriac Orthodox Church, the faithful in India received both Miaphysite and Nestorian bishops from different time periods until they formally came into full communion with Syriac Orthodox Church on 1652. Syriac bishops like Mar Sabor and Mar Proth arrived at Malankara between the eighth and ninth centuries from Persia. They established churches in Quilon, Kadamattom, Kayamkulam, Udayamperoor, and Akaparambu.

==== Knanaya Archdiocese ====
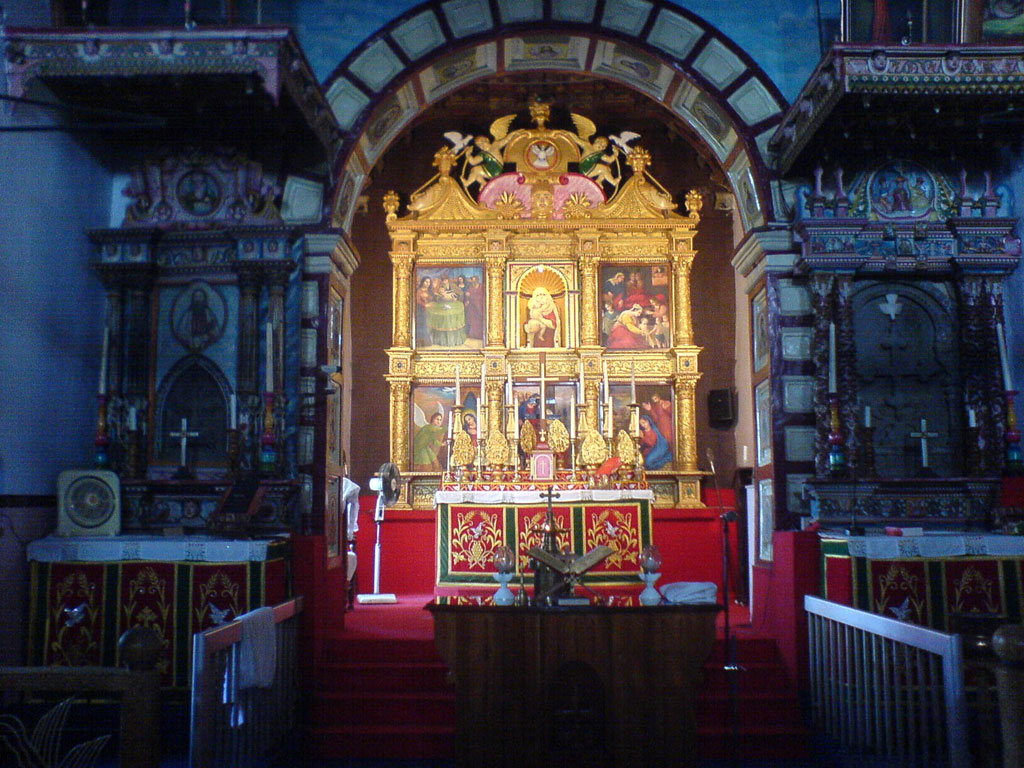
Altar of St. Mary's Knanaya Syriac church, Kottayam

The Knanaya Archdiocese, in full communion with the Syriac Orthodox Church, exists as an archdiocese for the ethnic Knanaya community in Kerala who practice strict endogamy. It was due to this they were given a separate archdiocese. They are under the guidance and direction of Archbishop Mor Severious Kuriakose. They migrated to Kerala under the leadership of the Syriac merchant Knāy Thoma (Thomas of Cana) who arrived in Kerala in the year 345 AD with a bishop from Edessa, while another legend traces their origin to Jews in the Middle East.

==== Evangelistic Association of the East ====
The E.A.E. Archdiocese is the missionary association of the Syriac Orthodox Church, founded in 1924 by Geevarghese Athunkal Cor-Episcopa at Perumbavoor. This archdiocese is under the direct control of the patriarch under the guidance of Chrysostomos Markose. It is an organization with churches, educational institutions, orphanages, nursing homes, convents, publications, mission centers, gospel teams, care missions and a missionary training institute. It is registered in 1949 under the Indian Societies Registration Act. XXI of 1860 (Reg. No. S.8/1949ESTD 1924). Honnavar Mission is a spiritual and charitable organization based in Honnavar, Karnataka, The mission serves under the guidance of Metropolitan Anthonios Yaqu'b.

Separations

==== Malankara Marthoma Syrian Church ====
The Malankara Marthoma Syrian Church is an independent Oriental Protestant church that was excommunicated from the Syriac Orthodox Church by Patriarch Mor Ignatius Peter IV due to their Eastern Protestant practices. Their first reforming metropolitan, Mathews Athanasius, was ordained by Ignatius Elias II in 1842.

==== Malankara Orthodox Syrian Church ====
The Malankara Orthodox Syrian Church’s 1934 Constitution recognizes the Syriac Orthodox Patriarch of Antioch as its primate. However, the church maintains that this authority is primarily historical and honorific, operating under the full administrative and ecclesiastical jurisdiction of its own Catholicos and Holy Synod.

Disagreements over patriarchal authority led to significant factional divisions within the Malankara Church in India. The Holy Universal Synod of the Syriac Orthodox Church issued a decree of excommunication against the faction aligned with autocephaly in 1975, a position reaffirmed in subsequent synods, notably by the Malankara Synod in 2017 and the Universal Synod in 2025, which was recognized by the Coptic and Armenian Apostolic churches. Conversely, the Malankara Orthodox Syrian Church considers these excommunications ecclesiastically invalid, asserting its self-governing (autocephalous) status as upheld by multiple rulings of the Supreme Court of India.

=== Europe ===
Earlier in the 20th century, many Syriacs emigrated to Western Europe, settling in countries like the Netherlands, Germany, Sweden, Switzerland and other countries for economic and political reasons. The Mor Ephrem Monastery in the Netherlands is the first Syriac Orthodox monastery in Europe, established in 1981. The Mor Awgen Monastery in Arth, Switzerland and Mor Jacob of Serugh Monastery in Warburg, Germany are the other monasteries located in Europe. The most recent Syriac Orthodox monastery in Europe is the Holy Cross Monastery in Sweden.

Region	Diocese or vicariate	Metropolitan
Belgium	Patriarchal Vicariate of Belgium, France and Luxembourg	George Kourieh
Germany	Patriarchal Vicariate of Germany	Philoxenus Mattias Nayis
Germany	Ecumenical Movement in Germany	Julius Hanna Aydın
Netherlands	Patriarchal Vicariate of the Netherlands	Polycarpus Augin (Eugene) Aydın
Spain	Patriarchal Vicariate of Spain	Nicolaos Matti Abd Alahad
Sweden	Archbishopric of Sweden and Scandinavia	Yuhanon Lahdo
Sweden	Patriarchal Vicariate of Sweden	Dioskoros Benyamen Atas
Switzerland	Patriarchal Vicariate of Switzerland and Austria	Dionysius Isa Gürbüz
United Kingdom	Patriarchal Vicariate of United Kingdom	Athanasius Toma Dawod

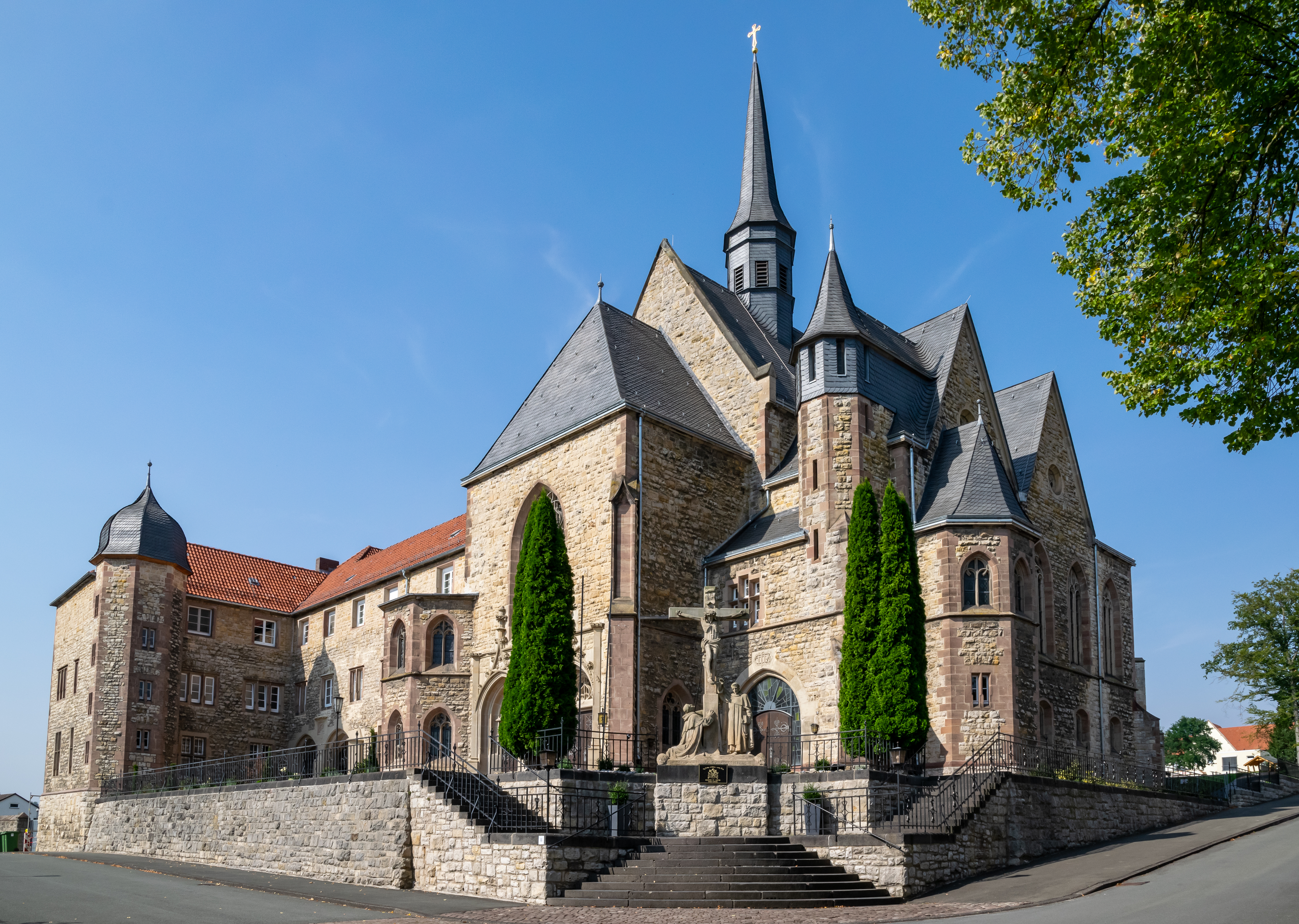
St. Jacob of Sarug Monastery Warburg, Germany

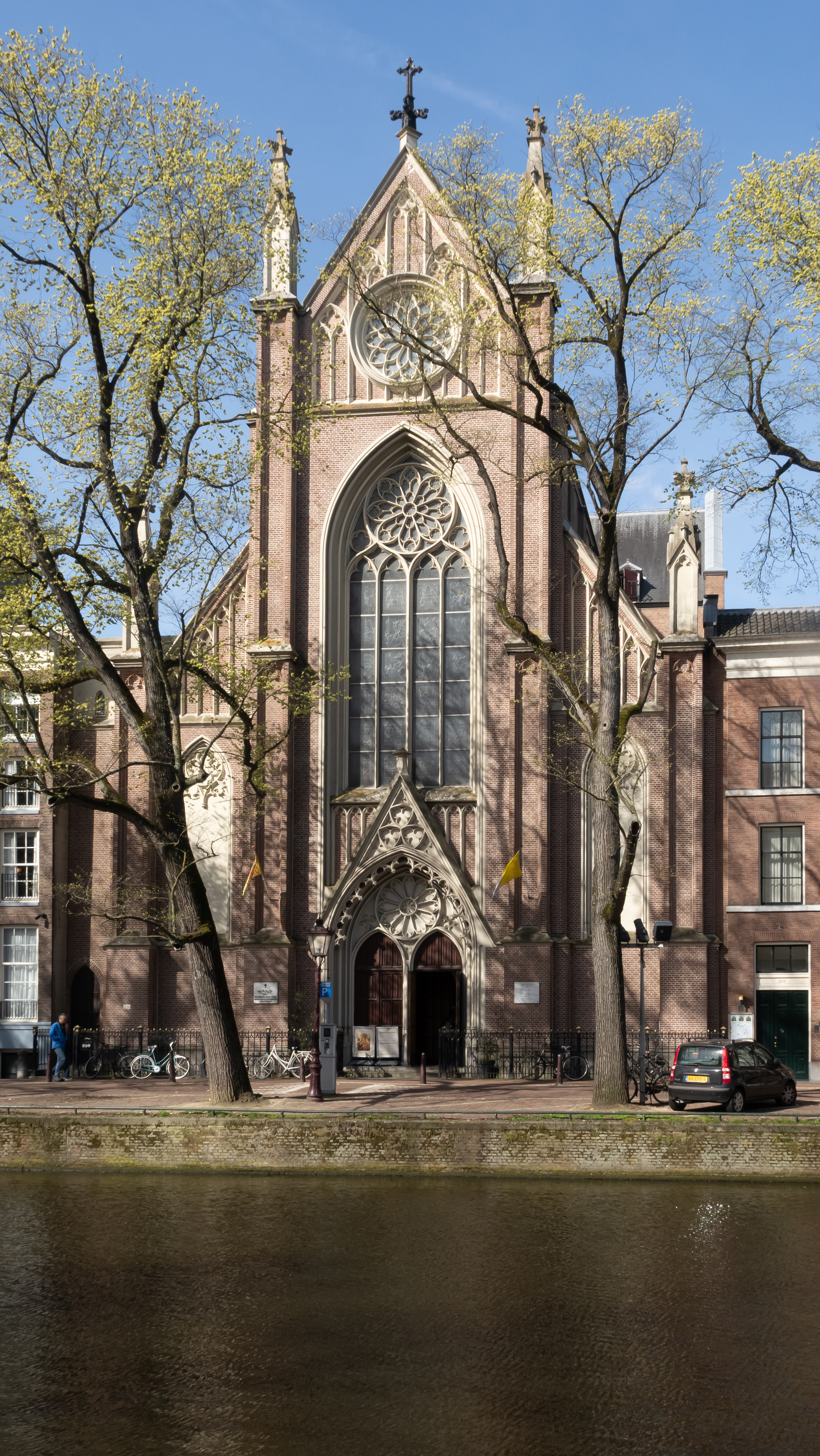
Church of Our Lady, Amsterdam, Netherlands

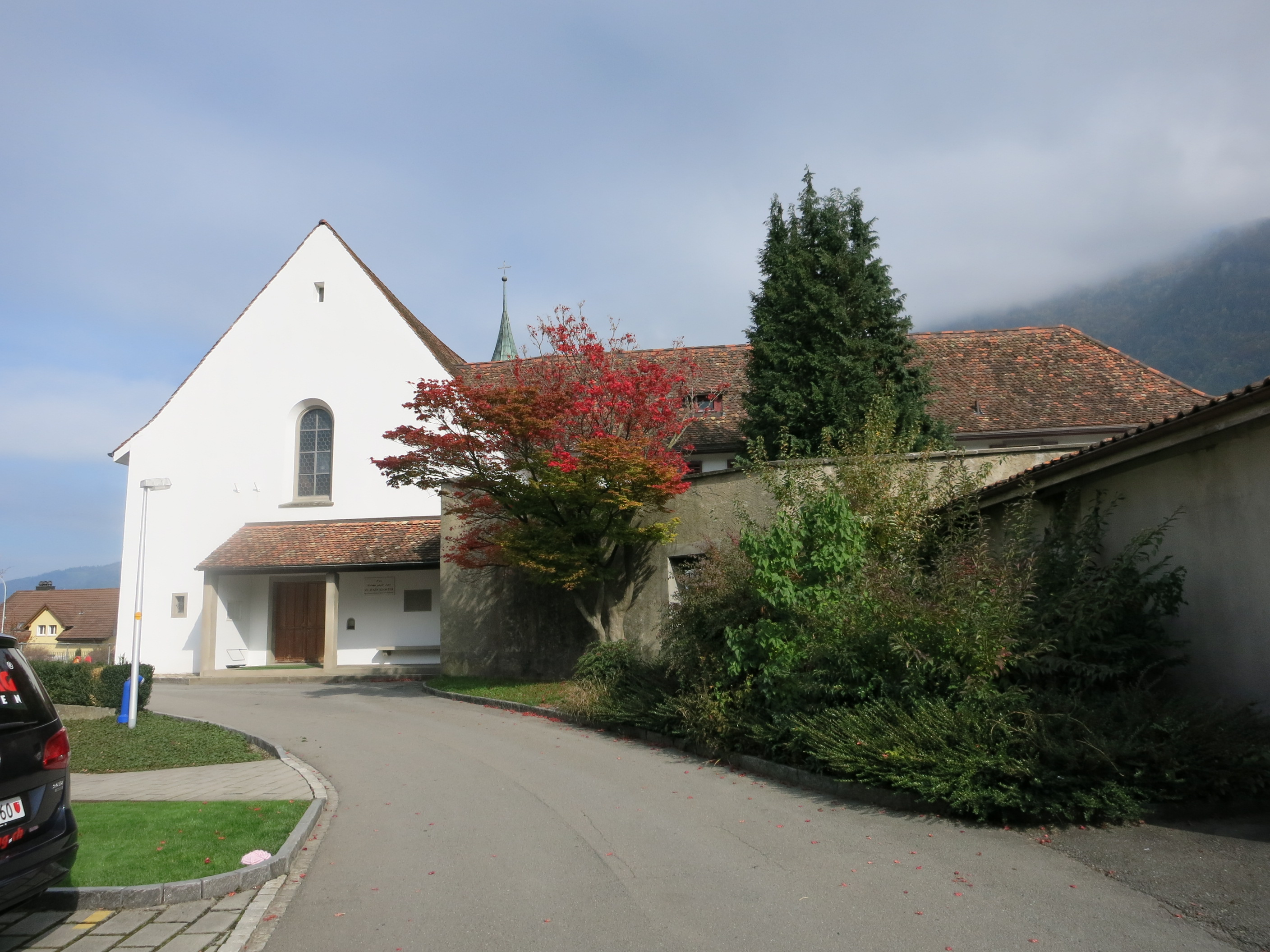
St. Avgin Monastery, Arth, Switzerland

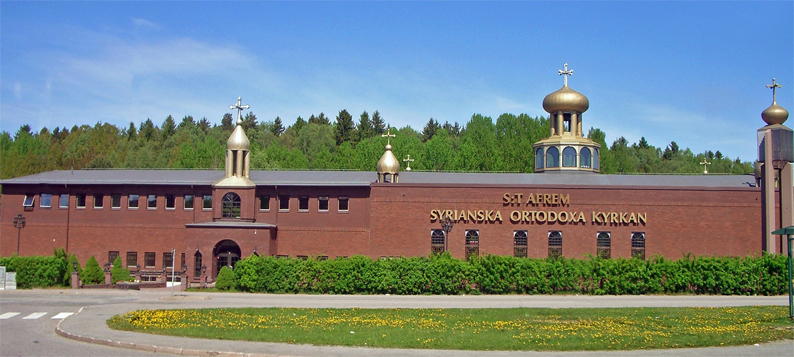
St. Aphrem Cathedral, Södertälje, Sweden

=== Oceania ===
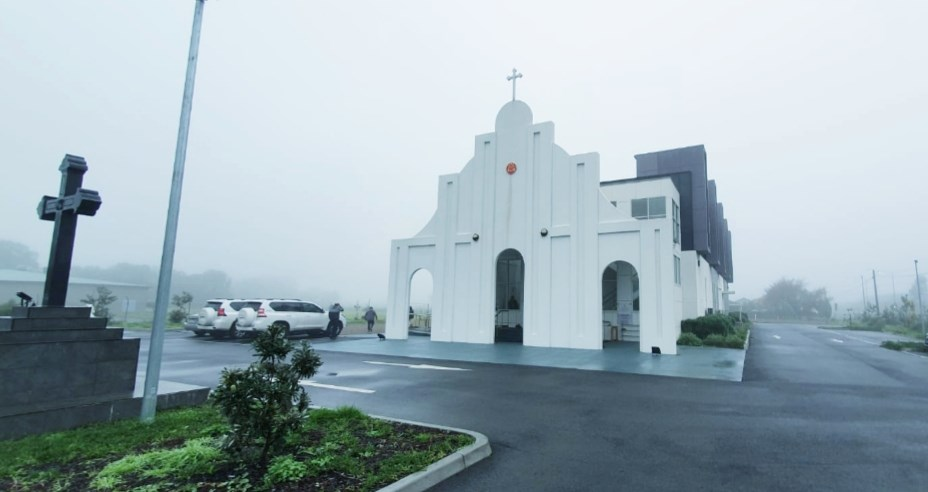
St. George Church, Melbourne

The Patriarchal Vicariate of Australia and New Zealand was founded under the patriarch's authority, and is currently led by Archbishop Malatius Malki Malki. The vicariate is headquartered in the Saint Ephraim Syriac Orthodox church.

== Institutions ==
The church has various seminaries, colleges, and other institutions. Patriarch Aphrem I Barsoum established St. Aphrem's Clerical School in the year 1934 in Zahlé, Lebanon. In 1946, the school was moved to Mosul, Iraq. It provided the church with a selection of graduates, the first among them being Patriarch Ignatius Zakka I Iwas and many other church leaders.

In 1990, the Order of St. Jacob Baradaeus was established for nuns. Seminaries have been instituted in Sweden and in Salzburg, Austria for the study of Syriac theology, history, language, and culture. The church has an international Christian education center for religious education. The Antioch Syrian University was established on 8 September 2018 in Maarat Saidnaya, near Damascus. The university offers engineering, management and economics courses. The Happy Child House project inaugurated in 2022 provides childcare services in Damascus, Syria.

== Ecumenical relations ==
The Syriac Orthodox Church is active in ecumenical dialogues with various churches, including the Catholic Church, Eastern Orthodox churches, Anglican Communion, Church of the East, and other Christian denominations. The church is an active member of the World Council of Churches since 1960 and Patriarch Ignatius Zakka I Iwas was one of the former presidents of the WCC. It has also been involved in the Middle East Council of Churches since 1974. Since 1998, representatives of Syriac Orthodox Church, together with representatives of other Oriental Orthodox churches, participate in ecumenical dialogue and also in various forms of interfaith dialogue.

=== Catholic Church ===
There are some common Christological and pastoral agreements with the Catholic Church. By the 20th century as the Chalcedonian schism was not seen with the same relevance, and from several meetings between the authorities of the Catholic Church and the Oriental Orthodox, reconciling declarations emerged in the common statements of the Patriarch Ignatius Jacob III and Pope Paul VI in 1971, Patriarch Ignatius Zakka I Iwas and Pope John Paul II in 1984 issued a common statement:

The confusions and schisms that occurred between their Churches in the later centuries, they realise today, in no way affect or touch the substance of their faith, since these arose only because of differences in terminology and culture and in the various formulae adopted by different theological schools to express the same matter. Accordingly, we find today no real basis for the sad divisions and schisms that subsequently arose between us concerning the doctrine of Incarnation. In words and life, we confess the true doctrine concerning Christ our Lord, notwithstanding the differences in interpretation of such a doctrine which arose at the time of the Council of Chalcedon.

The precise differences in theology that caused the Chalcedonian controversy is said to have arisen "only because of differences in terminology and culture and in the various formulae adopted by different theological schools to express the same matter", according to a common declaration statement between Patriarch Ignatius Jacob III and Pope Paul VI on Wednesday 27 October 1971.

In 2015, Pope Francis addressed the Syriac Orthodox Church as "a church of Martyrs", welcoming the visit of Ignatius Aphrem II to the Holy See.

=== Russian Orthodox Church ===
In 2015, Ignatius Aphrem II visited Patriarch Kirill of Moscow of the Russian Orthodox Church and discussed prospects of bilateral and theological dialogue existing since the late 1980s. The two leaders discussed various contemporary issues, including the situation of Christians in the Middle East and the role of the Russian Orthodox Church in addressing these concerns at international forums. They also explored ways to strengthen relations between their respective churches and coordinate their positions on matters related to conflict and violence.

== See also ==
- Dioceses of the Syriac Orthodox Church
- Syriac Orthodox Patriarch of Antioch and All the East
  - List of Syriac Orthodox Patriarchs of Antioch
- Naheere
- The Ascetical Homilies of Isaac the Syrian
- Oriental Orthodoxy
  - Miaphysitism, Cyril of Alexandria's Christology
- Syriac Christianity
- Jacobite Syrian Christian Church
  - Catholicos of India
  - Maphrian
  - List of Maphrians

== Bibliography ==
- Atto, Naures (2011). Hostages in the Homeland, Orphans in the Diaspora: Identity Discourses Among the syrian/Syriac Elites in the European Diaspora. Amsterdam University Press. ISBN 978-90-8728-148-9. Archived from the original on 18 October 2023.
- Atto, Naures; Barthoma, Soner O. (2017). "Syriac Orthodox Leadership in the Post-Genocide Period (1918–26) and the Removal of the Patriarchate from Turkey". Let Them Not Return: Sayfo - The Genocide Against the Assyrian, Syriac, and Chaldean Christians in the Ottoman Empire. New York-Oxford: Berghahn Books. pp. 113–131. ISBN 978-1-78533-499-3. Archived from the original on 15 January 2023.
- Aydin, Mor Polycarpus Augin (3 July 2018). "The Syriac tradition of the work of the Holy Spirit in the Church to make it One, Holy, Catholic and Apostolic". International Journal for the Study of the Christian Church. 18 (2–3). Informa UK Limited: 124–131. doi:10.1080/1474225x.2018.1516428. ISSN 1474-225X. S2CID 150675986.
- Benni, C.B. (1871). The Tradition of the Syriac Church of Antioch, Concerning the Primacy and the Prerogatives of St. Peter and of His Successors the Roman Pontiffs. Burns, Oates.
- Borbone, Pier Giorgio (2017). "From Tur 'Abdin to Rome: The Syro-Orthodox Presence in Sixteenth-Century Rome". Syriac in its Multi-Cultural Context. Leuven: Peeters Publishers. pp. 277–287. ISBN 978-90-429-3164-0. Archived from the original on 3 August 2023.
- Brock, Sebastian P. (1999). "The Importance of the Syriac Traditions in Ecumenical Dialogue on Christology". Christian Orient. 20: 189–197.
- Brock, Sebastian P. (2004). "The Syriac Churches in Ecumenical Dialogue on Christology". Eastern Christianity: Studies in Modern History, Religion and Politics. London: Melisende. pp. 44–65. ISBN 978-1-901764-23-9. Archived from the original on 18 October 2023.
- Brock, Sebastian P. (2017). "Patriarch Severos' Letter on his Flight from Antioch in 518" (PDF). Hugoye: Journal of Syriac Studies. 20 (1): 25–50. doi:10.31826/hug-2018-200103. S2CID 212688775. Archived (PDF) from the original on 20 June 2022.
- Brock, S.P.; Kiraz, G.; Gorgias Press; Butts, A.M.; Beth Mardutho – The Syriac Institute; Van Rompay, L. (2011). Gorgias Encyclopedic Dictionary of the Syriac Heritage. Gorgias Press. ISBN 978-1-59333-714-8. Archived from the original on 18 October 2023.
- Chaillot, Christine (1998). The Syrian Orthodox Church of Antioch and All the East: A Brief Introduction to Its Life and Spirituality. Geneva: Inter-Orthodox dialogue. Archived from the original on 18 October 2023.
- Chatonnet, Francoise Briquel; Debie, Muriel (20 June 2023). The Syriac World: In Search of a Forgotten Christianity. Yale University Press. ISBN 978-0-300-27125-6.
- Clements, Henry (2019). "Documenting Community in the Late Ottoman Empire". International Journal of Middle East Studies. 51 (3): 423–443. doi:10.1017/S0020743819000369. S2CID 201442968. Archived from the original on 8 July 2023.
- Dalrymple, William (2012). "Introduction". The Slow Disappearance of the Syriacs from Turkey and of the Grounds of the Mor Gabriel Monastery. Münster: LIT Verlag. pp. 7–13. ISBN 978-3-643-90268-9. Archived from the original on 18 October 2023.
- Dinno, Khalid S. (2017). Harrak, Amir (ed.). "The Synods and Canons in the Syrian (Syriac) Orthodox Church in the Second Millennium: An Overview". Journal of the Canadian Society for Syriac Studies. 17: 21–36. doi:10.31826/9781463238940-003. ISBN 978-1-4632-3894-0. S2CID 189674025. Archived from the original on 17 March 2022.
- Donabed, Sargon G.; Donabed, Ninos (2006). Assyrians of Eastern Massachusetts. Charleston: Arcadia Publishing. ISBN 978-0-7385-4480-9. Archived from the original on 18 October 2023.
- Donabed, Sargon G.; Mako, Shamiran (2009). "Ethno-cultural and Religious Identity of Syrian Orthodox Christians" (PDF). Chronos: Revue d'Histoire de l'Université de Balamand. 19: 69–111. Archived (PDF) from the original on 27 January 2021.
- Donabed, Sargon G. (2015). Reforging a Forgotten History: Iraq and the syrians in the Twentieth Century. Edinburgh: Edinburgh University Press. ISBN 978-0-7486-8605-6. Archived from the original on 18 October 2023.
- Elwell, Walter; Comfort, Philip Wesley (2001), Tyndale Bible Dictionary, Tyndale House Publishers, ISBN 0-8423-7089-7
- Fahlbusch, E.; Bromiley, G.W.; Lochman, J.M.; Mbiti, J.; Pelikan, J. (2008). The Encyclodedia of Christianity. The Encyclopedia of Christianity. Eerdmans Publishing Company. ISBN 978-0-8028-2417-2. Archived from the original on 18 October 2023.
- Farag, Lois (2011). "The Middle East". Christianities in Asia. Chichester: John Wiley & Sons. pp. 233–254. ISBN 978-1-4443-9260-9. Archived from the original on 18 October 2023.
- Gaunt, David; Beṯ-Şawoce, Jan; Donef, Racho (2006). Massacres, Resistance, Protectors: Muslim-Christian Relations in Eastern Anatolia During World War I. Piscataway, NJ: Gorgias Press. ISBN 978-1-59333-301-0. Archived from the original on 12 August 2023.
- Grabar, G.W.B.P.R.L.B.O.; Bowersock, G.W.; Brown, P.; Brown, P.R.L.; Grabar, O.; Caseau, B.; Cameron, A.; Chadwick, H.; Fowden, G.; Geary, P.J. (2001). Interpreting Late Antiquity: Essays on the Postclassical World. Belknap Press of Harvard University Press. ISBN 978-0-674-00598-3. Archived from the original on 18 October 2023.
- Griffith, Sidney H. (2002). The Beginnings of Christian Theology in Arabic: Muslim-Christian Encounters in the Early Islamic Period. Aldershot: Ashgate. ISBN 978-0-86078-889-8. Archived from the original on 18 October 2023.
- Griffith, Sidney H. (2005). "Answering the Call of the Minaret: Christian Apologetics in the World of Islam". Redefining Christian Identity: Cultural Interaction in the Middle East Since the Rise of Islam. Leuven: Peeters Publishers. pp. 91–126. ISBN 978-90-429-1418-6. Archived from the original on 18 October 2023.
- Haar Romeny, Bas ter (2004). "The Identity Formation of Syrian Orthodox Christians as Reflected in Two Exegetical Collections: First Soundings". Parole de l'Orient. 29: 103–121. Archived from the original on 17 March 2022.
- Haar Romeny, Bas ter (2005). "From Religious Association to Ethnic Community: A Research Project on Identity Formation among the Syrian Orthodox under Muslim Rule". Islam and Christian–Muslim Relations. 16 (4): 377–399. doi:10.1080/09596410500250248. S2CID 146155860.
- Haar Romeny, Bas ter (2012). "Ethnicity, Ethnogenesis and the Identity of Syriac Orthodox Christians". Visions of Community in the Post-Roman World: The West, Byzantium and the Islamic World, 300–1100. Farnham: Ashgate Publishing. pp. 183–204. ISBN 978-1-317-00136-2. Archived from the original on 8 October 2023.
- Hage, Wolfgang (2007). Das orientalische Christentum. Stuttgart: Kohlhammer Verlag. ISBN 978-3-17-017668-3. Archived from the original on 2 August 2023.
- Hämmerli, Maria; Mayer, Jean-François (2016). Orthodox Identities in Western Europe: Migration, Settlement and Innovation. Taylor & Francis. ISBN 978-1-317-08490-7. Archived from the original on 18 October 2023.
- Hunter, Erica C. D. (2014). "The Syrian Orthodox Church". In Leustean, Lucian N. (ed.). Eastern Christianity and Politics in the Twenty-First Century. Routledge. pp. 541–562. ISBN 978-1-317-81866-3. Archived from the original on 18 October 2023.
- Jarjour, T. (2018). Sense and Sadness: Syriac Chant in Aleppo. Oxford University Press. ISBN 978-0-19-063528-2. Archived from the original on 18 October 2023.
- Jastrow, Otto (2011). "Ṭuroyo and Mlaḥsô". The Semitic Languages: An International Handbook. Berlin-Boston: Walter de Gruyter. pp. 697–707. ISBN 978-3-11-025158-6. Archived from the original on 18 October 2023.
- Jongerden, Joost; Verheij, Jelle (2012). Social Relations in Ottoman Diyarbekir, 1870–1915. Brill. pp. 222–. ISBN 978-90-04-22518-3. Archived from the original on 18 October 2023.
- Joseph, John (1983). Muslim-Christian Relations and Inter-Christian Rivalries in the Middle East: The Case of the Jacobites in an Age of Transition. SUNY Press. ISBN 978-0-87395-600-0. Archived from the original on 18 October 2023.
- Kaufhold, Hubert (2000). "Notizen zur Späten Geschichte des Barsaumo-Klosters". Hugoye: Journal of Syriac Studies. 3 (2).
- Kevorkian, Raymond (2011). The Armenian Genocide: A Complete History. I.B. Tauris. pp. 91, 94, 365–366, 368, 371–379, 887, 901. ISBN 978-0-85773-020-6. Archived from the original on 18 October 2023.
- Kiraz, George A. (2007). "Kthobonoyo Syriac: Some Observations and Remarks" (PDF). Hugoye: Journal of Syriac Studies. 10 (2): 129–142. Archived (PDF) from the original on 25 February 2021.
- Kiraz, George A. (2019). The Syriac Orthodox in North America (1895–1995): A Short History. Piscataway, NJ: Gorgias Press. ISBN 978-1-4632-4037-0. Archived from the original on 18 October 2023.
- Kiraz, George A. (2020). "Negotiating Identity with the Homeland: The Syriac Orthodox of North America in the Early Twentieth Century". From Polarization to Cohabitation in the New Middle East. Wiesbaden: Harrassowitz Verlag. pp. 77–94. ISBN 978-3-447-11456-1. Archived from the original on 18 October 2023.
- Kitchen, Robert A. (2012). "The Syriac Tradition". The Orthodox Christian World. London & New York: Routledge. pp. 66–77. ISBN 978-1-136-31484-1. Archived from the original on 3 August 2023.
- Kurian, G.; Nelson, T. (2001). Nelson's Dictionary of Christianity: The Authoritative Resource on the Christian World. Thomas Nelson. ISBN 978-1-4185-3981-8. Archived from the original on 18 October 2023.
- Loetscher, L.A. (1977). The New Schaff-Herzog Encyclopedia of Religious Knowledge: Embracing Biblical, Doctrinal, and Practical Theology and Biblical, Theological, and Ecclesiastical Biography from the Earliest Times to the Present Day, Based on the 3d Ed. of the Realencyklopädie Founded by J. J. Herzog, and Edited by Albert Hauck, Prepared by More Than Six Hundred Scholars and Specialists Under the Supervision of Samuel Macauley Jackson (editor-in-chief) with the Assistance of Charles Colebrook Sherman and George William Gilmore (associate editors) ... [et al.]. Baker. ISBN 978-0-8010-7947-4. Archived from the original on 18 October 2023.
- Loosley, Emma (2010). "Peter, Paul and James of Jerusalem: The Doctrinal and Political Evolution of the Eastern and Oriental Churches". Eastern Christianity in the Modern Middle East. London & New York: Routledge. pp. 1–12. ISBN 978-1-135-19371-3. Archived from the original on 18 October 2023.
- Makko, Aryo (19 July 2017). "The Assyrian 'concept of unity' after Seyfo" (PDF). In Hannibal Travis (ed.). The Assyrian Genocide: Cultural and Political Legacies. London: Routledge. pp. 239–253. doi:10.4324/9781315269832. ISBN 978-1-315-26983-2 – via Assyrian International News Agency.
- Markessini, J. (2012). Around the World of Orthodox Christianity – Five Hundred Million Strong: The Unifying Aesthetic Beauty. Dorrance Publishing Company. ISBN 978-1-4349-1486-6. Archived from the original on 18 October 2023.
- Masters, B. (2004). Christians and Jews in the Ottoman Arab World: The Roots of Sectarianism. Cambridge Studies in Islamic Civilization. Cambridge University Press. ISBN 978-0-521-00582-1. Archived from the original on 18 October 2023.
- Menze, Volker L. (2008). Justinian and the Making of the Syrian Orthodox Church. OUP Oxford. ISBN 978-0-19-156009-5. Archived from the original on 18 October 2023.
- Meyendorff, John (1989). Imperial Unity and Christian Divisions: The Church 450–680 A.D. Crestwood, NY: St. Vladimir's Seminary Press. ISBN 978-0-88141-056-3. Archived from the original on 12 January 2023.
- Millar, Fergus (2013). "The Evolution of the Syrian Orthodox Church in the Pre-Islamic Period: From Greek to Syriac?" (PDF). Journal of Early Christian Studies. 21 (1): 43–92. doi:10.1353/earl.2013.0002. S2CID 170436440. Archived (PDF) from the original on 30 January 2021.
- Minahan, J. (2002). Encyclopedia of the Stateless Nations: A–C. Westport, Conn.: Greenwood Press. ISBN 978-0-313-32109-2.
- Moolayil, Kuriakose Corepiscopa (2011). A Guide to the Altar Assistants with Syriac Orthodox Lectionary Notes. pp. 14–17.
- Murre van den Berg, Heleen (2011) [2009]. "Syriac Orthodox Church". The Encyclopedia of Christian Civilization. Vol. 4. Malden: Wiley-Blackwell. pp. 2304–2309. Archived from the original on 26 March 2023.
- Murre-van den Berg, Heleen (2013). "A Center of Transnational Syriac Orthodoxy: St. Mark's Convent in Jerusalem". Journal of Levantine Studies. 3 (1): 61–83. Archived from the original on 17 September 2021.
- Murre van den Berg, Heleen (2015). "Classical Syriac and the Syriac Churches: A Twentieth-Century History". Syriac Encounters: Papers from the Sixth North American Syriac Symposium. Louvain: Peeters Publishers. pp. 119–148. ISBN 978-90-429-3046-9. Archived from the original on 18 October 2023.
- Murre-van den Berg, Heleen (2019). "Syriac Identity in the Modern Era". The Syriac World. London: Routledge. pp. 770–782. ISBN 978-1-138-89901-8. Archived from the original on 3 August 2023.
- Neill, Stephen (2004) [1984]. A History of Christianity in India: The Beginnings to AD 1707. Cambridge: Cambridge University Press. ISBN 978-0-521-54885-4. Archived from the original on 18 October 2023.
- Neill, Stephen (2002) [1985]. A History of Christianity in India: 1707–1858. Cambridge: Cambridge University Press. ISBN 978-0-521-89332-9. Archived from the original on 29 July 2023.
- Nieper, Jens (2012). "The Syrian Orthodox Church: The Aramean Community as an Ecumenical Entity in a Transnational Dimension". The Slow Disappearance of the Syriacs from Turkey and of the Grounds of the Mor Gabriel Monastery. Münster: LIT Verlag. pp. 57–62. ISBN 978-3-643-90268-9. Archived from the original on 18 October 2023.
- Öktem, Kerem (2015). "Incorporating the time and space of the ethnic other: Nationalism and space in Southeast Turkey in the nineteenth and twentieth centuries". Nations and Nationalism. 10 (4): 559–578. doi:10.1111/j.1354-5078.2004.00182.x.
- O'Mahony, Anthony (2006). "Syriac Christianity in the modern Middle East". The Cambridge History of Christianity: Eastern Christianity. Vol. 5. Cambridge: Cambridge University Press. pp. 511–536. ISBN 978-0-521-81113-2. Archived from the original on 3 August 2023.
- Özcoşar, Ibrahim (2014). "Separation and Conflict: Syriac Jacobites and Syriac Catholics in Mardin in the Eighteenth and Nineteenth Centuries". Byzantine and Modern Greek Studies. 38 (2): 201–217. doi:10.1179/0307013114Z.00000000045. S2CID 162368464. Archived from the original on 8 July 2023.
- Palmer, Andrew (1991). "The History of the Syrian Orthodox in Jerusalem". Oriens Christianus. 75: 16–43. Archived from the original on 18 October 2023.
- Parry, Ken (2010). The Blackwell Companion to Eastern Christianity. John Wiley & Sons. ISBN 978-1-4443-3361-9. Archived from the original on 18 October 2023.
- Perczel, István (2019). "Syriac Christianity in India". The Syriac World. London: Routledge. pp. 653–697. ISBN 978-1-138-89901-8. Archived from the original on 3 August 2023.
- Saint-Laurent, Jeanne-Nicole Mellon (2015). Missionary Stories and the Formation of the Syriac Churches. University of California Press. pp. 94–. ISBN 978-0-520-96058-9. Archived from the original on 18 October 2023.
- Seleznyov, Nikolai N. (2013). "Jacobs and Jacobites: The Syrian Origins of the Name and its Egyptian Arabic Interpretations". Scrinium: Journal of Patrology, Critical Hagiographyand Ecclesiastical History. 9: 382–398. Archived from the original on 28 December 2021.
- Schmoller, Andreas (2020). "The Syriac Orthodox and Coptic Orthodox Churches in Austria: Inter-Church Relations and State Recognition". Mashriq & Mahjar: Journal of Middle East and North African Migration. 8 (1). Moise A. Khayrallah Center for Lebanese Diaspora Studies: 76–102. ISSN 2169-4435.
- Smith, W. (1863). A Dictionary of the Bible: Comprising Its Antiquities, Biography, Geography, and Natural History. A Dictionary of the Bible: Comprising Its Antiquities, Biography, and Natural History. J. Murray. p. 73.
- Snelders, Bas (2010). Identity and Christian-Muslim Interaction: Medieval Art of the Syrian Orthodox from the Mosul Area. Louvain: Peeters Publishers. ISBN 978-90-429-2386-7. Archived from the original on 18 October 2023.
- Sommer, Renate (2012). "The Role of Religious Freedom in the Context of the Accession Negotiations between the European Union and Turkey - The Example of the Arameans". The Slow Disappearance of the Syriacs from Turkey and of the Grounds of the Mor Gabriel Monastery. Münster: LIT Verlag. pp. 157–170. ISBN 978-3-643-90268-9. Archived from the original on 18 October 2023.
- Swiderski, Richard Michael (1988). "Northists and Southists: A Folklore of Kerala Christians". Asian Folklore Studies. 47 (1). Nanzan University: 73–92. doi:10.2307/1178253. JSTOR 1178253.
- Taylor, William (2013). Narratives of Identity: The Syrian Orthodox Church and the Church of England 1895–1914. Newcastle upon Tyne: Cambridge Scholars Publishing. ISBN 978-1-4438-6946-1.
- The Oxford selection of Psalms and hymns, for the use of parish churches. 1857. Archived from the original on 18 October 2023.
- Thomas, D.R. (2001). Syrian Christians Under Islam: The First Thousand Years. Biblical Studies and Religious Studies. Brill. ISBN 978-90-04-12055-6. Archived from the original on 18 October 2023.
- Trimingham, John Spencer (1979). Christianity Among the Arabs in pre-Islamic Times. London: Longman. ISBN 978-0-582-78081-1. Archived from the original on 18 October 2023.
- Weltecke, Dorothea (2006b). "On the Syriac Orthodox in the Principality of Antioch during the Crusader Period" (PDF). East and West in the Medieval Eastern Mediterranean I: Antioch from the Byzantine Reconquest until the End of the Crusader Principality. Leuven: Peeters Publishers. pp. 95–124. Archived (PDF) from the original on 2 March 2021.
- Weltecke, Dorothea (2009). "Michael the Syrian and Syriac Orthodox Identity". Church History and Religious Culture. 89 (1–3): 115–125. doi:10.1163/187124109X408023. Archived from the original on 11 September 2021.
- Whitehouse, T. (1873). Lingerings of light in a dark land: researches into the Syrian church of Malabar.
- Wozniak, Marta (2015). From religious to ethno-religious: Identity change among Assyrians/Syriacs in Sweden (PDF). Joint Sessions of Workshops organized by the European Consortium for Political Research. ECPR. Archived (PDF) from the original on 26 October 2019.
