= Ignatius Aphrem I =

120th Patriarch of Syriac Orthodox Church of Antioch (1933-1957)

His Holiness Moran Mor Ignatius Aphram I Barsoum Patriarch of Antioch and All the East
- 120th Patriarch of the Syriac Orthodox Church
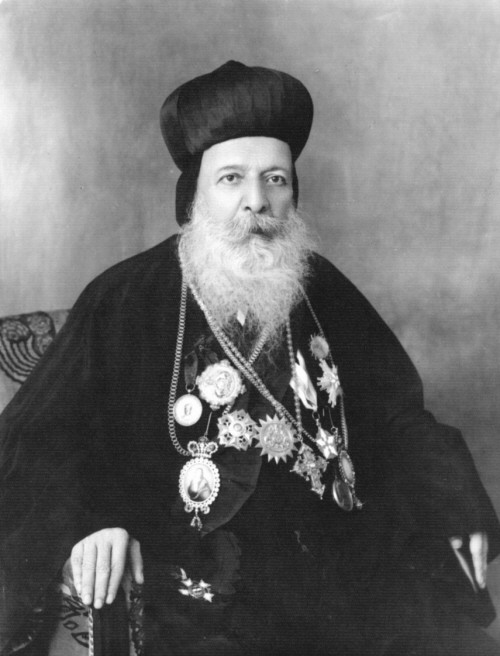
- Native name: ܡܪܢ ܡܪܝ ܐܝܓܢܛܝܘܣ ܐܦܪܝܡ ܒܪܨܘܡ
- Church: Syriac Orthodox Church
- See: Apostolic see of Antioch and all the East
- Predecessor: Ignatius Elias III
- Successor: Ignatius Jacob III
- Previous post: Archbishop of Syria and Lebanon

Orders
- Ordination: Monk in 1907
- Consecration: Archbishop: 20 May 1918, Patriarch: 30 January 1933

Personal details
- Born: Ayoub Barsoum; 15 June 1887 Mosul, Ottoman Iraq
- Died: 23 June 1957 (aged 70) Syria
- Buried: Homs, Syria
- Denomination: Syriac Orthodox

Mor Ignatius Aphrem I Barsoum (Classical Syriac: ܡܪܢ ܡܪܝ ܐܝܓܢܐܛܝܘܣ ܐܦܪܝܡ ܒܪܨܘܡ, Arabic: إغناطيوس أفرام الأول برصوم, June 15, 1887 – June 23, 1957) was the 120th Syriac Orthodox Patriarch of Antioch and head of the Syriac Orthodox Church from 1933 until his death in 1957. He was consecrated as a Metropolitan and as a Patriarch at a very hard time for the Syriac Orthodox church and its people and parishes and he worked very hard to re-establish the church initiations to where his people moved. He researched, wrote, translated, scripted, and published many scholarly works that included books on the saints, tradition, liturgy, music, and history of Syriac Orthodox Church.

== Early life and education ==
Barsoum was born in Mosul, Ottoman Empire and was given the name Ayoub, from the biblical name Job (أيوب برصوم - his baptism name). He was born to Istefane Barsoum and Sussan AbdulNour, descendants of two prominent Syriac Orthodox families in Mosul. When he was 4 years old, his family enrolled him in a school run by the Dominican mission in Mosul. In that school, he studied Languages, History, Religions, and many other subjects. There, he mastered Arabic and French and a good deal of Syriac and Turkish languages and he wrote in the mission newspaper, Iklil Al-Ward. After finishing school, he started teaching at the same school. In 1905, he was ordained as a Reader (Qoroyo) and Sub-Deacon (Aphodyacon) by Dionysius Bihnam Samarji, Archbishop of Mosul at that time. After some time teaching at the school and with encouragement from his family and from Archbishop Dionysius Bihnam Samarji, he decided to join the priesthood and become a monk. Aged 17, he went to the Deir al-Za`faran monastery in Mardin, the headquarters of the Syriac Orthodox Church where he opted for a clerical life and started his theological training in 1905. In the monastery, he studied Syriac theology, Syriac language and literature, English, and philosophy. He also read many books from the monastery's library.

== Ordination ==
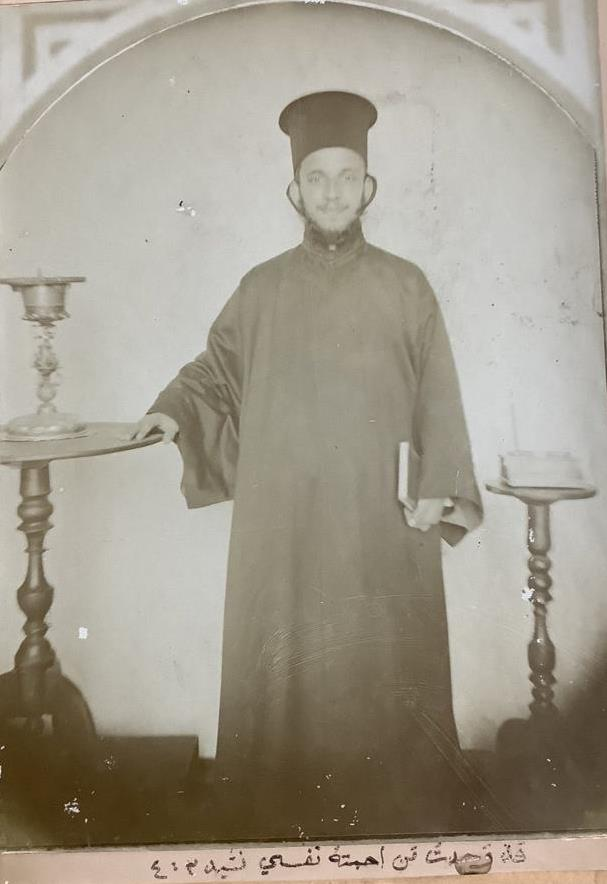
Ignatius Afram I Barsoum after he was ordained Monk

In 1907, when he was only 20 years old, he was ordained a Monk in the Monetary by the Patriarch Ignatius Abded Aloho II and called him Aphram after the great St. Ephrem, the Syrian, the great 4th century Christian Theologian and writer. In 1908 he was ordained a priest by the same Patriarch. He remained at the monastery to teach in the seminary and in 1911 he assumed the additional responsibility of managing the monastery press. He also was a member and worked within Syriac society called Intibah that had a goal of raising the education levels for the Syriac people. Later that year, he began his first scholarly visit to the monasteries and churches of Mardin, Tur-Abdin, Azech, Khrbut, Nisibin, Al-Ruha, Mosul and its villages, Aleppo, Homs, Beirut, Istanbul, Jerusalem, and Egypt. During this trip, he read and collected valuable information and wrote list of all their books and manuscripts that helped him in his future literary works. In 1913, he embarked on a second trip to examine Syriac manuscripts in many great libraries of Europe. In 1917, he represented Gregorius, Metropolitan of Jerusalem, in the church Synod to elect the new Patriarch, Ignatius Elias III as the 119th Patriarch of Syriac Orthodox Church after the Church went for two years without a leader.

== Episcopal consecration ==
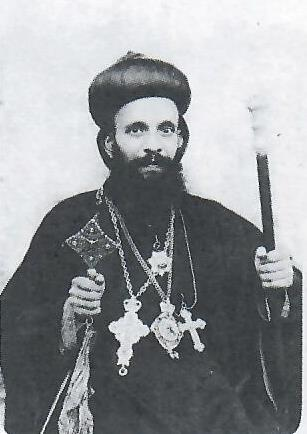
Severus Aphram Barsoum after his consecration as Archbishop of Syria and Lebanon in 1918

On May 20, 1918, Patriarch Ignatius Elias III consecrated Aphrem as an archbishop and named him Mor Severus, Archbishop of Syria and Lebanon and his see was in Homs, Syria. Shortly after that, he went home to Mosul to visit his family and friends and met many people from different part of society in Mosul. In 1919, he accompanied Patriarch Ignatius Elias III on his visit to Istanbul where they had audience with the Ottoman Sultan, Mehmet Wahid. From Istanbul, he embarked on a journey to Paris, France to represent the Syriac Orthodox church at the Paris Peace Conference. During his time in France, he researched all the old Syriac manuscripts in many libraries in France. When the conference concluded, he went to London to meet with Archbishop of Canterbury and also research the Syriac manuscripts in the British libraries before his return in May, 1920. Two years later, the League of Nations' action making Syria a French mandate brought him a new responsibility of providing for refugees from Cilicia in 1922 and in 1923 and the refugees from Al-Ruha (Urfa) in 1924 where he undertook the responsibility of securing housing, food, education, and other needs. All these refugees were in addition to the thousand of refugees that arrived after Sayfo. With that he also took on the responsibility of building of 10 new churches for the refugees in and near Aleppo, other parts of Syria and in Lebanon. On the 24th of March 1925و he attended in Beirut the opening of the Assyrian National School Association.

Another journey took Mor Severus to Geneva and Lausanne as an apostolic delegate to the World Conference on Faith and Order (August 3–21, 1927) where he was a member and conveyed the greetings of the Syriac Orthodox Patriarch to the conference attendees. Soon afterwards he traveled as an emissary of the Patriarch to the United States, where he investigated the condition of the Syriac Orthodox Church, consecrated three new churches, and ordained new priests. He also gave lectures on the Syriac language and literature at the Providence University and the University of Chicago, and served at the Oriental Institute of the latter institution until his return in 1929.

== Patriarchal consecration ==
After the death of Patriarch Ignatius Elias III in 1932, the Synod of Bishops named Mor Severus as an acting Patriarch until a new patriarch is chosen. On January 30, 1933, he was elected as the 120th Patriarch of Syriac Orthodox Church of Antioch, assuming the ecclesiastical name of Mor Ignatius Aphrem I Barsoum. The new Patriarch quickly showed himself as an active Church head, establishing new dioceses, building new churches, establishing new schools, and founding a theological seminary in Zahla, Lebanon (later moved to Mosul, Iraq in 1945, then to Beirut, Lebanon, and finally to Damascus, Syria). In the aftermath of the collapse of the Ottoman Empire and the political situation in the new state of Turkey, where the seat of the Patriarchate was located in Deir al-Za'faran for about 10 centuries, Mor Aphrem was forced to relocate the Patriarchate to Homs in Syria.

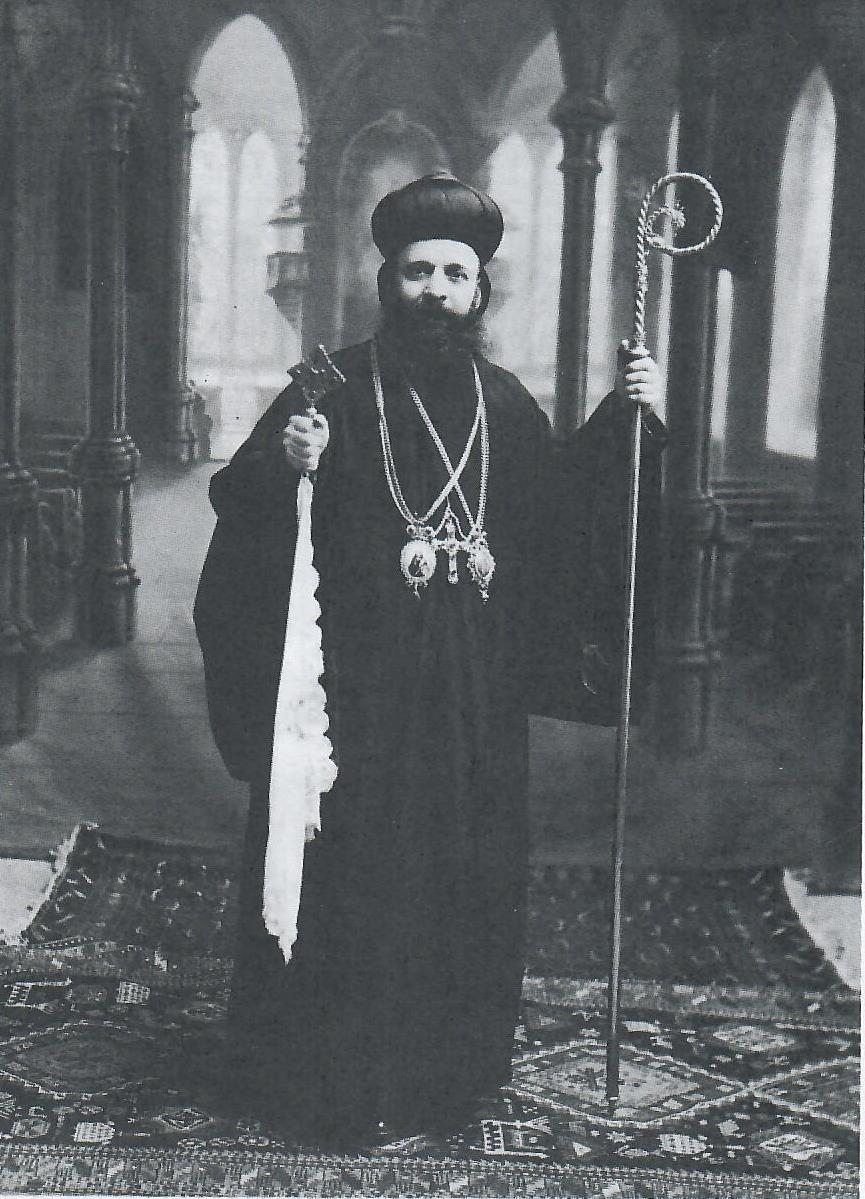
Ignatius Aphram I Barsoum after his consecration as Patriarch of Syriac Orthodox Church in 1933

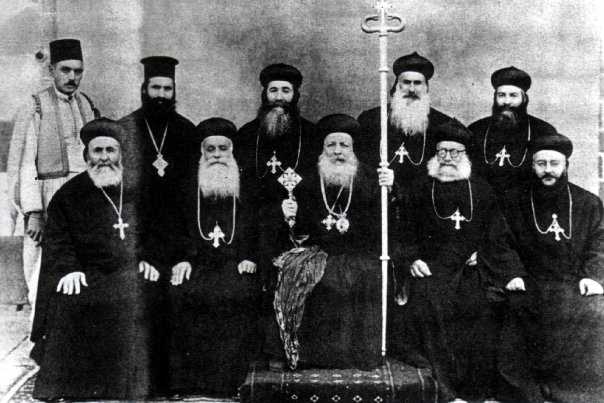
Ignatius Afram I Barsoum with a group of Archbishops after the consecration of Archbishop Gregorius Bulus Behnam in 1952

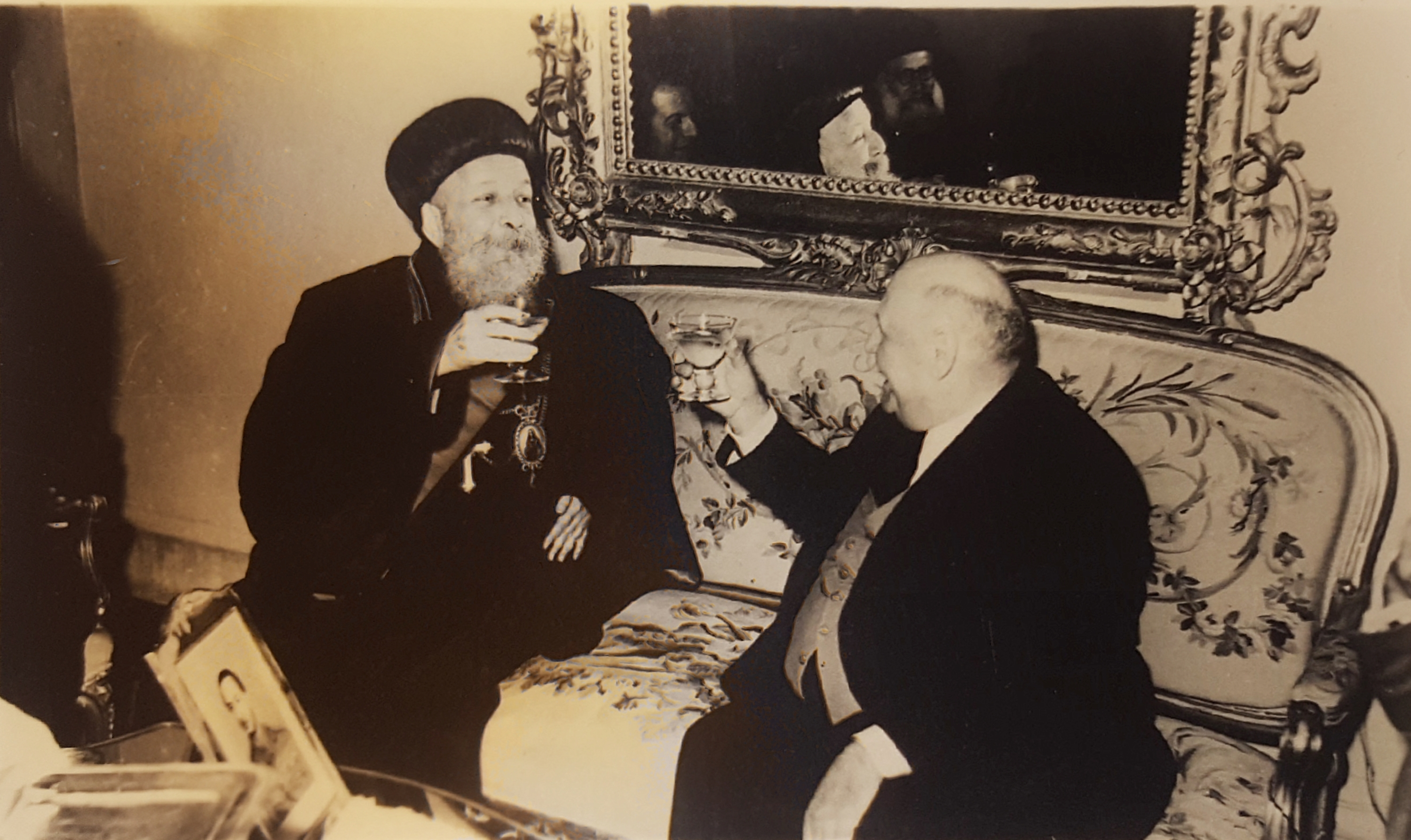
Ignatius Afram I Barsoum meeting with the President of Lebanon in 1954

== Paris Peace Conference ==
After World War I ended in 1918, the victorious Allies assembled for the Paris Peace Conference to resolve the issues that the war presented and set up terms for future peace in Europe, the Middle East, and other parts of the world. The Syriac Orthodox Church was one of the few none governmental institutions from the old Ottoman Empire that attended this conference and present their cases. Archbishop Aphrem traveled to Paris with his secretary, Dr. Abdalla Barsoum, to represent the church in this conference where he met the French President, Raymond Poincaré, and many French ministers. He also met with many delegates from the former Ottoman Empire Christian minority groups. He presented the church conditions and what happened to the people during the genocide in Turkey to the delegates of the conference and presented a six points plan to ensure the autonomy and safety of his people and requested financial compensation for the loss of lives and properties. He also presented a list of victims and casualties of about 90,000 people from the Syriac Orthodox Church including 7 bishops and 155 priests and monks killed, 336 villages destroyed, and 160 churches and monasteries in ruins. Soon, he was disillusioned, however, by the atmosphere of self-interest which prevailed among the delegates representing the victorious European powers and at one stage of the conference found himself defending not only the rights of his people, but those of the Arab nations where most of his Syriac Orthodox Church people lived after World War I. He outlined what happened in this conference to his confidant Archbishop Gregorius Bulus Behnam and there's an English translation for the same conversation. After Patriarch Aphram's participation in this conference and his call to establish a mandate for the Syriac and Assyrian people, he was prevented from entering Turkey again and his books were banned.

== Episcopal succession ==
During Ignatius Aphram time as Patriarch and Metropolitan, he had the duty to ordain and consecrate many Metropolitans in the Syria Orthodox church in addition to hundreds of priests, monks, and deacons. The list includes one future patriarch also.

1. Severus Jacob (1950-1957). Metropolitan of Beirut and Damascus. Later, he was elected as Ignatius Jacob III, the 121st Patriarch of Syriac Orthodox Church (1957-1980).
2. Dionysius Yohanna (1933). Metropolitan for the Patriarchal Office then Metropolitan of St. Matthew Monastery (1935-1942)
3. Eustathios Keryakos (1938-1988). Metropolitan of Al-Jazeera, Syria.
4. Philoxenus Jacob (1939-1946). Patriarch Vicar of Jerusalem
5. Timotheus Jacob (1946-1966). Metropolitan of St. Matthew Monastery.
6. Gregorius Keryakos (1946-1966). Bishop in Malabar, India.
7. Severus Bulus (1946-1962). Metropolitan in Malaber, India.
8. Athanasius Yeshue Samuel (1947-1957) Metropolitan of Jerusalem and (1957–1994) Metropolitan of the United States.
9. Philoxenos Yuhanon Dolabani (1947-1969). Metropolitan of Mardin, Turkey.
10. Dionysius Gergees (1950-1992). Metropolitan of Aleppo, Syria.
11. Clemis Abraham (1951-2002). Metropolitan of Knanaya Archdiocese, India.
12. Gregorius Bulus Behnam (1952-1969). Metropolitan of Mosul, Iraq then Metropolitan of Baghdad & Basra, Iraq.
13. Iyawanis Afram (1952-1984). Bishop of Tur-Abdin, Turkey
14. Philoxenus Bulus (1952). Metropolitan in Malabar, India
15. Malatius Barnaba (1957-2004). Patriarch Vicar then Metropolitan of Homs

== Literary work ==
Despite the numerous responsibilities of his work in leading the Syriac Orthodox Church through the hard times and his and his travel to visit the churches around the world, Patriarch Aphrem devoted a lot of his time to writing about the church, Syriac Orthodox Saints and fathers, and about Syriac literature and history.

Patriarch Aphrem produced many works which some have never been published. His work was written and published in both Syriac and Arabic. Of his published works:

=== The Scattered Pearls ===
Patriarch Aphrem wrote one of the most important books in the Syriac Church Orthodox, The Scattered Pearls: History of Syriac Literature and Sciences (Arabic: اللؤلؤ المنثور في تاريخ العلوم والآداب السريانية) is a monumental research work in the history of science and Syriac literature and the people who contributed to this history. It was completed in the 1920s by Barsoum and published in 1943. The book was translated to several languages, the English translation was by Matti Moosa. It was published by Georgias Press in 2011.

=== Published work ===
==== Books ====
In addition to the Scattered Pearls, Patriarch Aphrem published the following books during his life:

1. The History of Tur Abdin, written in Syriac and translated to Arabic by Bishop Gregorius Bulus Behnam and to English by Matti Moosa. Gorgias Press 2011
2. Al-Tuhfa al-Ruhiyya fi al-Salat al-Fardiyya ("The Golden Key of the Obligatory Prayers"), 1911.
3. Al-Zahra al-Qudsiyya fi al-Talim al-Masihia ("The Divine Flower of the Christian Catechism"), 1912.
4. Nuzhat al-Adhhan fi Tarikh Dayr al-Zafaran ("The Excursion of the Mind in the History of Za`faran"), 1917.
5. Anonymous Chronicles of 819, CORPUS SCRIPTORUM CHRISTIANORUM ORIENTALIUM (CSCO) 081 (Syr 36), 1920.
6. Mukhtasar fi Al-Ta'alim Am-Masihi (The Shorter Catechism of the Syrian Orthodox Church of Antioch), 1926. Book to be taught in schools. An English translation by Rev. Fr. Elias Sugar, 1950.
7. A translation of Kitab Tahdibh al-Akhlaq ("The Training of Characters"), by Yahya Ibn Adi, published in the Journal of Semitic Languages and Literature, Chicago, 1928.
8. An edition of Bar Hebraeus Risala fi Ilm al-Nafs al-Insaniyya ("A Treatise on the Human Soul"), 1938.
9. A translation of Bar Hebraeus Hadith al-Hikma ("The Speech of Wisdom"), 1940.
10. Al-Durar al-Nafisa fi Mukhtasar Tarikh al-Kanisa ("The Precious Pearls of the Compendious History of the Church"), 1940.
11. Al-Alfaz al-Suryaniyya fi al-Maajim al-Arabiyya ("Syriac Words in the Arabic Lexicons"), 1951.
12. Fi Isem Al-Uma Al-Suryania (The Syrian Church of Antioch: Its [sic] Name and History), 1952.
13. Al-Mawrid Al-Atheb fi Mukhtasar Tarikh Al-Kanisa ("The Sweet News in the History of the Church), 1953.
14. Qithar al-Qulub ("The Harp of the Hearts"), a volume of collected poems, 1954.

==== Short Books or Articles ====
Items 1 and 3 were translated and included in The Collected Historical Essays of Aphram I Barsoum

1. Madrasat Antakia Al-Lahutia (Antioch Theological School), 1930.
2. A'alam Al Syrian (Syriac Notables), 1931.
3. Lama'a fi Tarikh Al-Uma Al-Suryania fi Al-Iraq (A Glimpse of the History of Syriac Nation in Iraq), 1936
4. Mazarea'a Al-Jazira (Al-Jazira Farms), 1955.
5. A'ayan Al-Syrian (Syriac Notables)

==== Books published posthumously ====
1. Risala fi Usul Al-Ta'arib from Al-Suryania language (An Article in Arabic Translation from Syriac), 1969.
2. Makhṭūṭāt Ṭūrʻabdīn (The Manuscripts of Tur Abdin in Arabic), 2008.
3. Makhṭūṭāt Dayr al-Zaʻfarān (The Manuscripts of Deir al-Za`faran monastery in Arabic), 2008.
4. Makhṭūṭāt Āmid wa-Mārdīn ( The manuscripts of Amid and Mardin in Arabic), 2008.
5. History of the Syriac Dioceses. Gorgias Press, LLC. 6 January 2011. ISBN 9781611436785.
6. The Collected Historical Essays of Aphram I Barsoum. Gorgias Press, LLC. 2 January 2019. ISBN 9781611436730.

=== Unpublished work ===
This list is a partial list of some of Patriarch Aphrem unpublished work

1. The History of the Syriac Orthodox Patriarchs of Antioch and the famous men of the Syriac Orthodox Church
2. Syriac-Arabic Dictionary that he started working on it since his early days at the monastery
3. Translations of ten liturgies of the Syriac Christianity to Arabic.
4. The Ecclesiastical History of Bar 'Ebroyo, 2nd part. Translated into Arabic in the second part of 1909 when he was a monk at the Monastery of Za'faran.
5. Index of Syriac manuscripts in different churches, monasteries, and with individuals that he put together before all the event that happened during World War I and the looting and destruction that happened to the Syriac churches and Monasteries during Sayfo. 3 volumes were published posthumously

== Holy Girdle of Mary ==
In 1953, while Patriarch Aphrem was reading few manuscripts he discovered a book written in Garshuni that was sent to the people of Mardin from the people of Homs in 1852. The book contained information about the Diocese of Homs and other dioceses in Syria from the time when the church was being renovated and enlarged. The Holy Girdle of Mary was found inside a glass vessel in the middle of the holy table in the altar. Based on these information, Patriarch Aphrem opened the Holy Sanctum in the attendance of Alexandros the Greek Orthodox bishop of Homs and other prominent persons. When the alter table was opened, they discovered a stone vessel covered with a thick round copper plate and the glass vessel was broken inside. They found the Holy Girdle folded and sign of age was apparent on it. The Girdle was examined by the antiquities authorities in Syria and it was found to be authentic. The Holy Girdle was put back in the alter where it is still today.

== Death ==
Patriarch Aphrem passed away in the morning of Sunday June 23, 1957 and was buried on Thursday June 27, 1957 at the Saint Mary Church of the Holy Belt Um Al-Zinar in Homs, Syria.

== See also ==
- Jacob Baradaeus
- Ignatius Elias III
- Ignatius Jacob III
- Ignatius Zakka I Iwas
- Gregorius Bulus Behnam (Arabic Wikipedia)
- Gregorios Yohanna Ibrahim

Preceded by Ignatius Elias III	List of Syriac Orthodox Patriarchs of Antioch; 1933–1957	Succeeded by Ignatius Jacob III
