= Holy Girdle =

Relic of the Blessed Virgin Mary

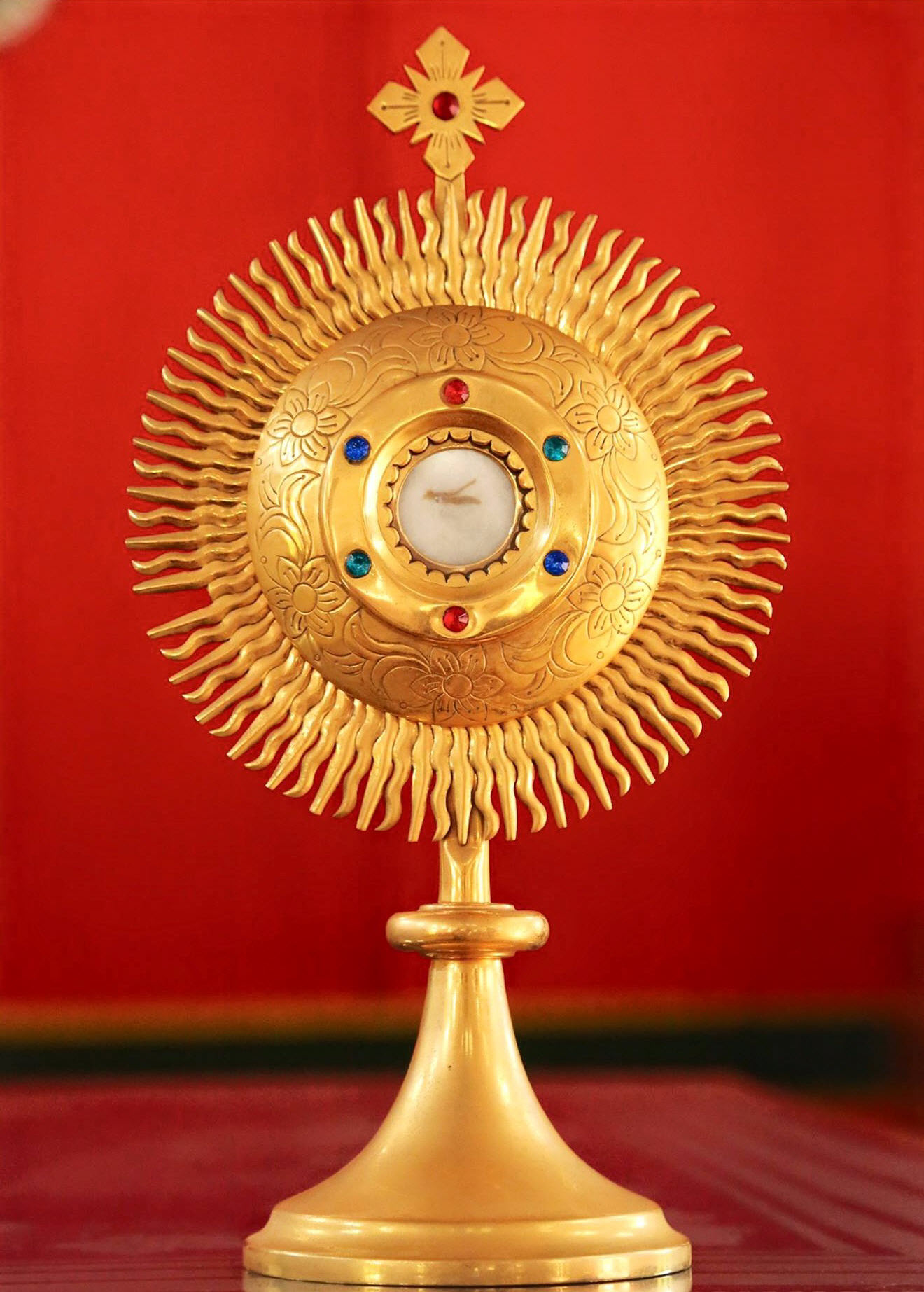
- Holy Belt of Mary
- Material: Knotted textile cord
- Size: Length 74 cm (29 in); Breadth 5 cm (2.0 in); Thickness 3 cm (1.2 in)
- Discovered: 1852, rediscovered April 1953; Saint Mary Church of the Holy Belt, Homs, Syria
- Discovered by: Patriarch Ignatius Aphrem I Barsoum
- Present location: Churches in Syria, India, Middle East

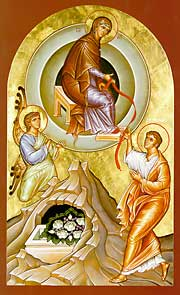
Icon depiction the Theotokos giving her girdle to Thomas the Apostle. Below is a styllized representation of Mary's Tomb, with flowers lying on the sarcophagus.

The Holy Girdle, also known as the Girdle of Thomas, Holy Girdle of Mary, Holy Zoonoro, (or) Zunoro, and Holy Belt of Saint Mary the mother of Jesus, is a relic of the Blessed Virgin Mary which is one of the important relics of Syriac Orthodox Church and venerated by Oriental Orthodox communion. The word Zunoro is also translated as "belt", "sash" or "girdle".

== Tradition ==
According to Eastern Christian tradition, the Virgin Mary was taken (assumed) into heaven in the presence of all apostles except Thomas, who was in India. He returned to Jerusalem and travelled on the sky by the help of Holy Spirit to attend the assumption of Mary. He was late to arrive and visualised that Mary's body had been taken by angels. Suffering from doubts at that time, Thomas requested Mary to give him a sign in her memory, which caused a chariot to stop in the air and Mary to gift her girdle to him. Thomas showed this girdle to other disciples of Jesus and convinced them. He took the girdle, otherwise known as a Zunoro, on his subsequent journeys. Those who believe in him claim that many miracles have happened since then as a result of touching or even seeing this girdle. The incident is not recorded in the Bible.

The Holy Girdle is taken out annually on the last day of 8 Day Lent in September.

== History ==
Saint Thomas the Apostle kept the holy belt with his own. After he died in Mylapore, his body and relics were kept in India. In 394 AD, the holy girdle moved from India to Uraha (modern Urfa, Turkey). and then to Homs in Syria, where it was placed in Saint Mary Church of the Holy Belt, also known as The Church of the Lady of the Girdle. The supreme head, Ignatius Aphrem I Barsoum, Patriarch of Antioch, studied manuscripts and a Garshunian book containing stories and speeches sent by the people of Homs in 1852. The archbishop of Homs ordered to renovate the church. On 20 July 1953, the Holy Girdle was discovered from the altar of the church by Barsoum in the presence of Alexandros, the Greek Orthodox bishop of Homs and it is existence is proven. It is considered to be one of the most important relics in Syriac Orthodox Church.

== Malankara Church ==
Some parts of Holy Girdle have been distributed throughout the Malankara Church. The churches in which the relics are installed are known as Soonoro Church. These include:

- Angamaly Soonoro Cathedral.
- Manarcad Church – Jacobite Syrian Christian Church, Universal Marian Pilgrim Centrer.
- Kottayam Cheriapally Maha Edavaka (St Mary's Orthodox Church, Kottayam, Kerala, India).
- Martha Mariam Cathedral Valiya Pally, Kothamangalam.
- Mor Ignathious Noorono Syrian Simhasana Church, Mekkadampu.
- Jacobite Syrian Cathedral Kundara – Kollam Diocese of Jacobite Syrian Christian Church.
- Mor Gregorios Jacobite Syrian Orthodox Cathedral Mettuguda (Secunderabad).
- St Mary's Jacobite Syrian Valiyapally.
- St. Mary's Church Meenangadi – E.A.E Archdiocese of the Syriac Orthodox Church.
- St. Mary's Jacobite Syrian Church, Poothamkutty.
- St. Mary's Jacobite Syrian Church, Varikoli

== Gallery ==
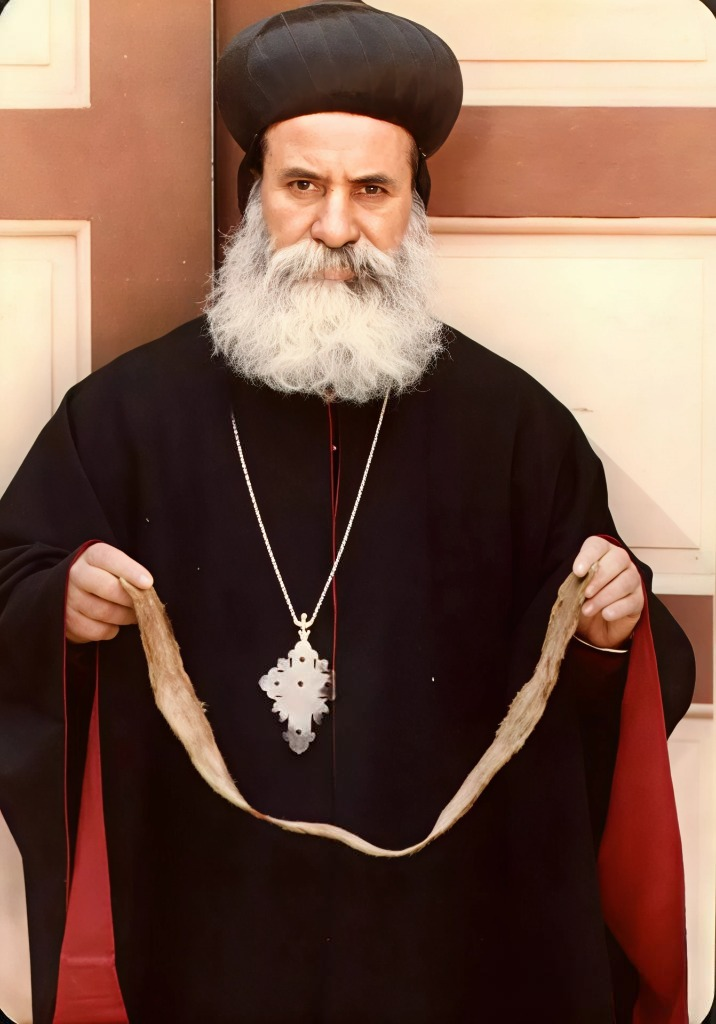
Late His Eminence Meletios Barnabas, former Arch Bishop of Homs, with the Holy Girdle of the Virgin Mary

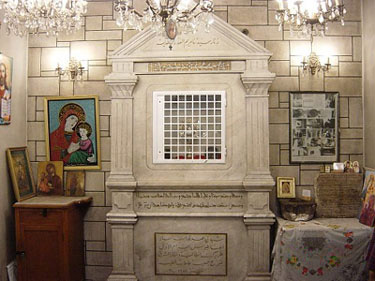
Saint Mary Church of the Holy Belt

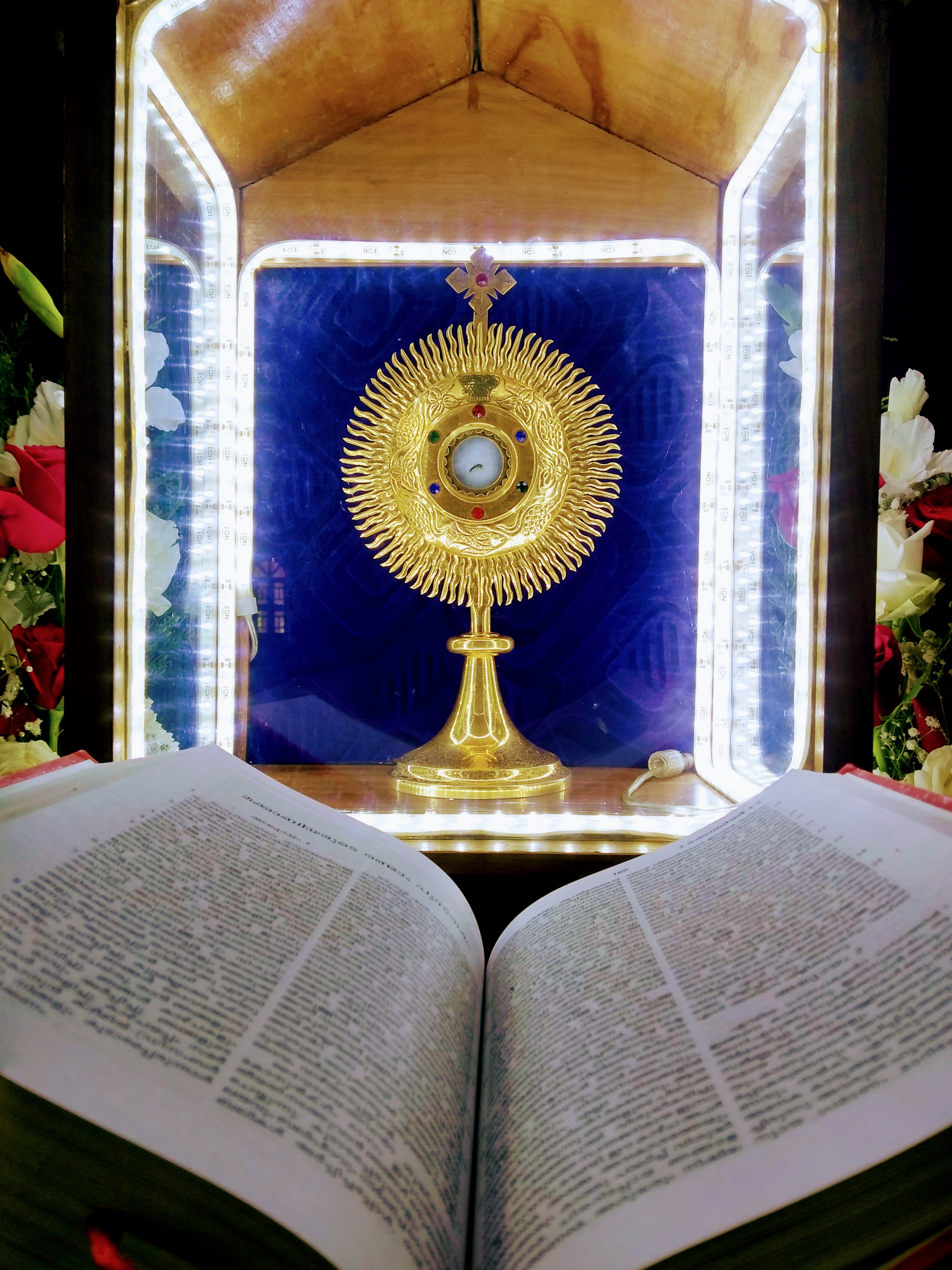
Holy girdle of St. Mary's Cathedral, Kundara

== See also ==
- Girdle of Thomas
- Virgin's veil
