= Syriac Orthodox Archdiocese of Syria =

Syriac Orthodox Church History

Syriac orthodox Church
- Incumbent none
- Style: Archbishop His Eminence

The Syriac Orthodox Archdiocese of Syria was nominally Metropolitan Archeparchy of the Syriac Orthodox Church with juriction over Syria and Lebanon from 1817 until 1933.

== History ==
Many dioceses that existed at the beginning of the XIX century were eliminated or combined as a result of conversion to Catholicism, particularly in Syria. Ended up with being a single diocese, having lost its communities in Aleppo, Damascus and in many towns and monasteries to the Syriac Catholic Church.

A new bishop was appointed in 1926 for the Diocese of Aleppo.

In 1933, during the synod of Homs, new dioceses were created for Syria.

== List of bishops ==
With the title of Metropolitan of Syria

Mor Gregorios George Sayyar (1817-1819) seated in Damascus, with the title of Aleppo.

Mor Julius Boutros (1846-1872) seated in Homs.

Mor Gregorios Abdullah Sattuf (1880-1886).

Mor Abded Mshiho (1886-1895).

Iyawannis Elias (1895-1896)

Mor Dionysius AbdulNour (1914-1917)

Mor Ephrem Barsoum (1918-1933), the title Lebanon, was added.

== Juridictions ==
Succeeded in 1933 by :

- Archdiocese of Beirut and Damascus
- Archdiocese of Jazirah and Euphrates

== See also ==
- Syriac Orthodox dioceses
