= Baroncelli Chapel =

Chapel in Santa Croce, Florence, Italy

Coordinates: 43°46′05″N 11°15′48″E

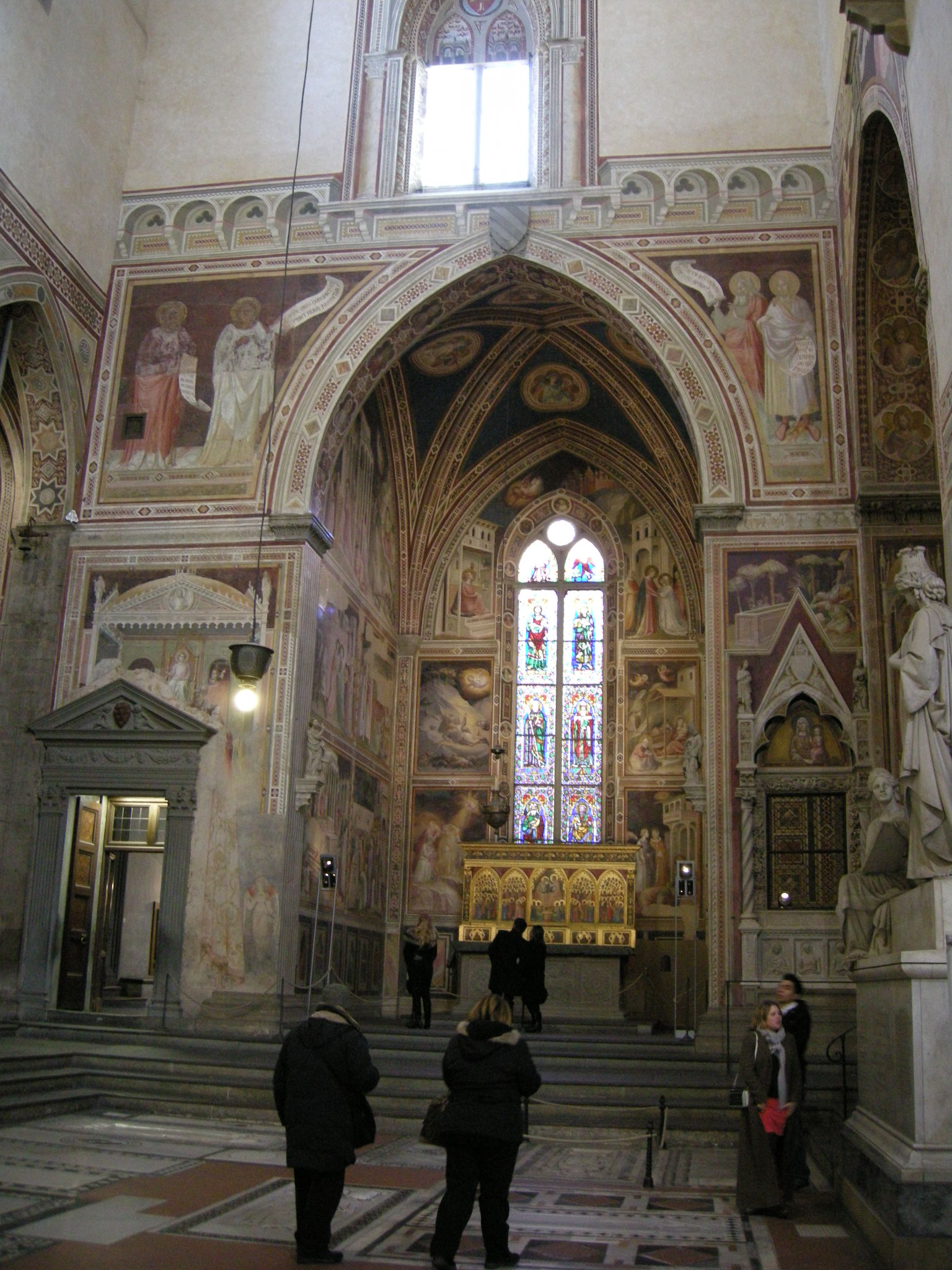
Baroncelli Chapel.

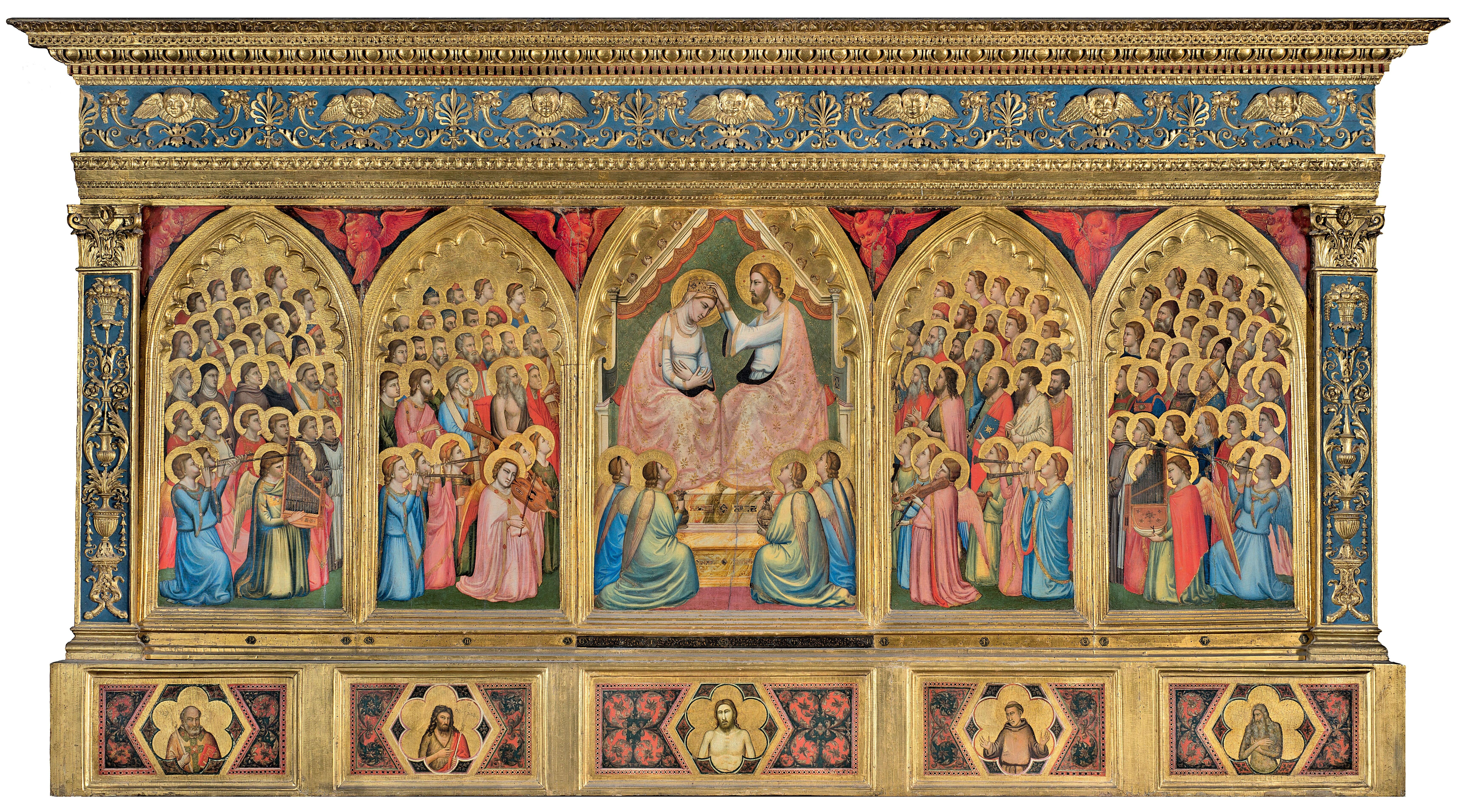
Baroncelli Polyptych, painted by Giotto.

The Baroncelli Chapel is a chapel located at the end of the right transept in church of Santa Croce, central Florence, Italy.

It has frescoes by Taddeo Gaddi executed between 1328 and 1338.

== Description ==
=== Gaddi artworks ===
The fresco cycle represents the Stories of the Virgin. In this work, Gaddi showed his mastership of Giotto's style, with a narrative disposition of the characters in the scenes, which are more crowded than his master's. He also continued to experiment with the use of geometrical perspective in the architectural background, obtaining illusionistic effects in details such as the oblique staircase in the Presentation at the Temple.

The two niches with still lifes in the basement are perhaps inspired by Giotto's ones in the Scrovegni Chapel.

The delicate and soft features are characteristic of Gaddi's late style. The adoption of night light in the Annunciation to the Shepherds is nearly unique in the mid-14th century painting of central Italy.

Gaddi also designed the stained glasses, with four prophets on the exterior, and perhaps had a hand in the altarpiece also: this, dating to c. 1328, has the signature Opus Magistri Jocti, but the style shows the hands of assistants, including Gaddi himself. It is an elaborate polyptych, depicting the Coronation of the Virgin surrounded by a crowded Glory of Angels and Saints. The cusp of the altarpiece is now at the San Diego Museum of Art of San Diego, California, United States. The original frame was replaced by a new one during the 15th century.

=== Other artworks ===
Other artworks in the chapel include, on the right wall, a Madonna of the Cintola by Sebastiano Mainardi.

The Baroncelli Polyptych, painted by Giotto di Bondone c.1334, is in the chapel.

The Baroncelli family owned the tomb on the external wall, which was designed by Giovanni di Balduccio in 1327. He also sculpted the statuettes of the Archangel Gabriel and the Annunciation on the arcade's pillars.

The "Madonna with Child" sculpture inside the chapel was created by Vincenzo Danti in 1568.

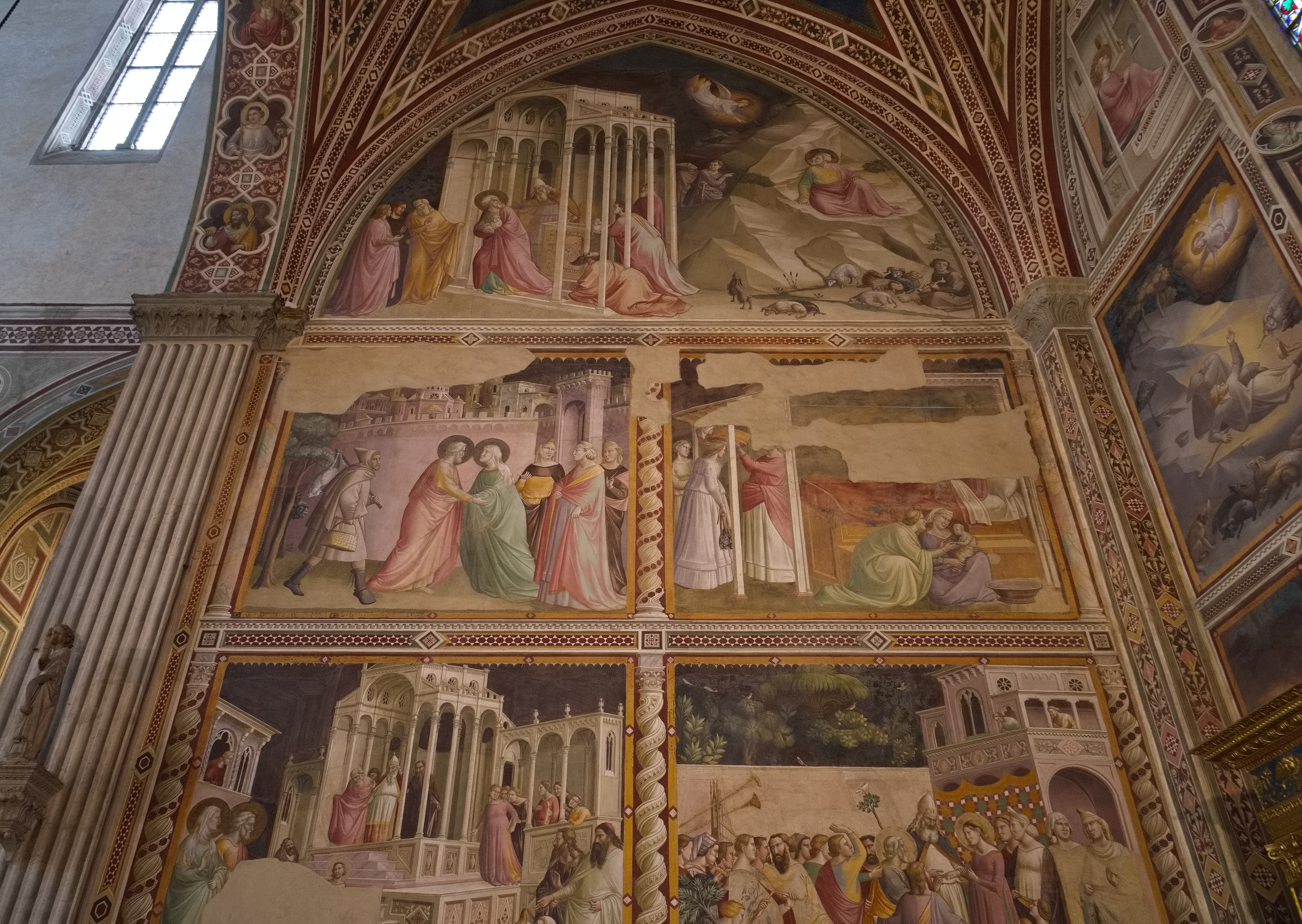
Stories of the Virgin (north wall)

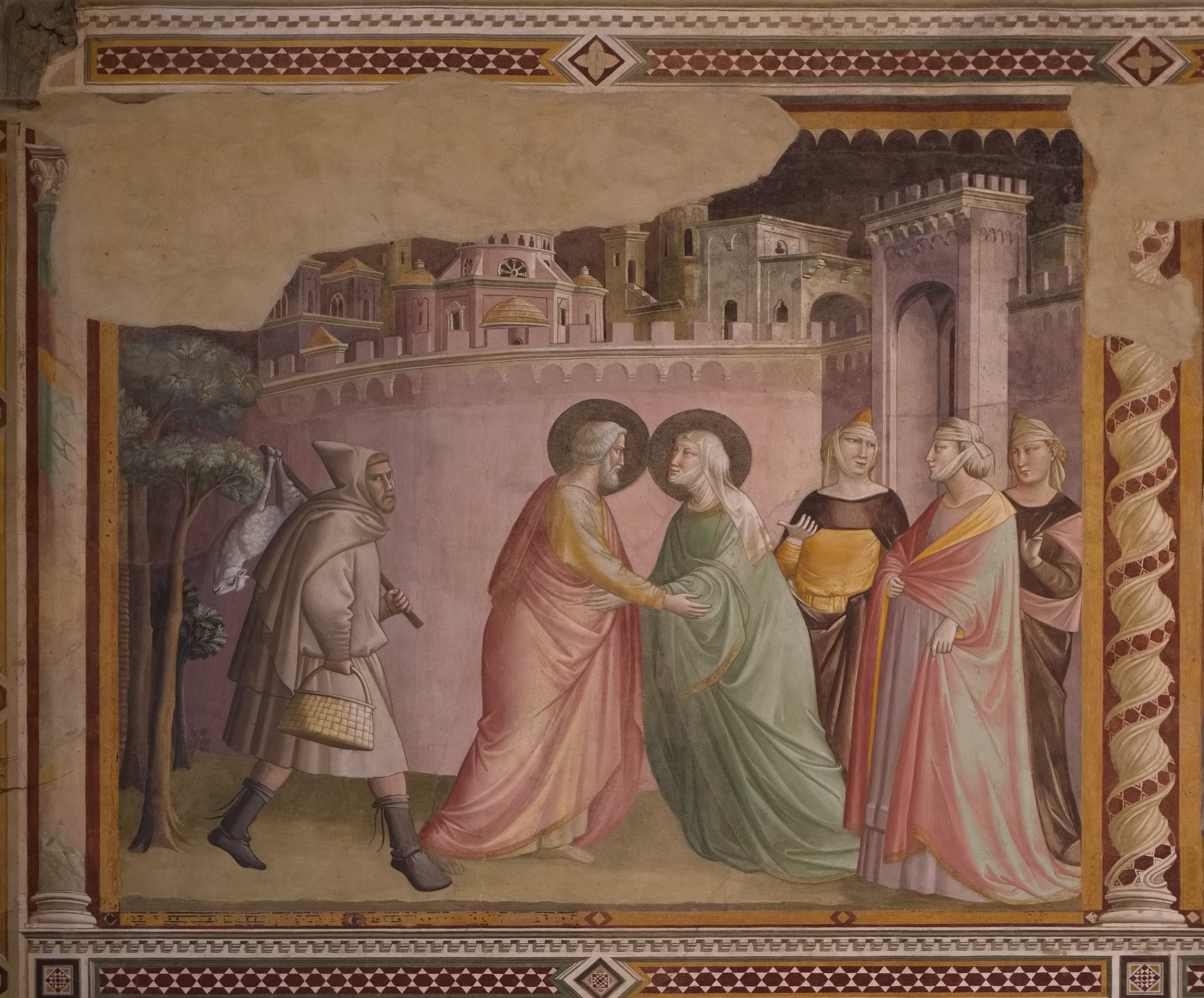
Visitation (north wall)

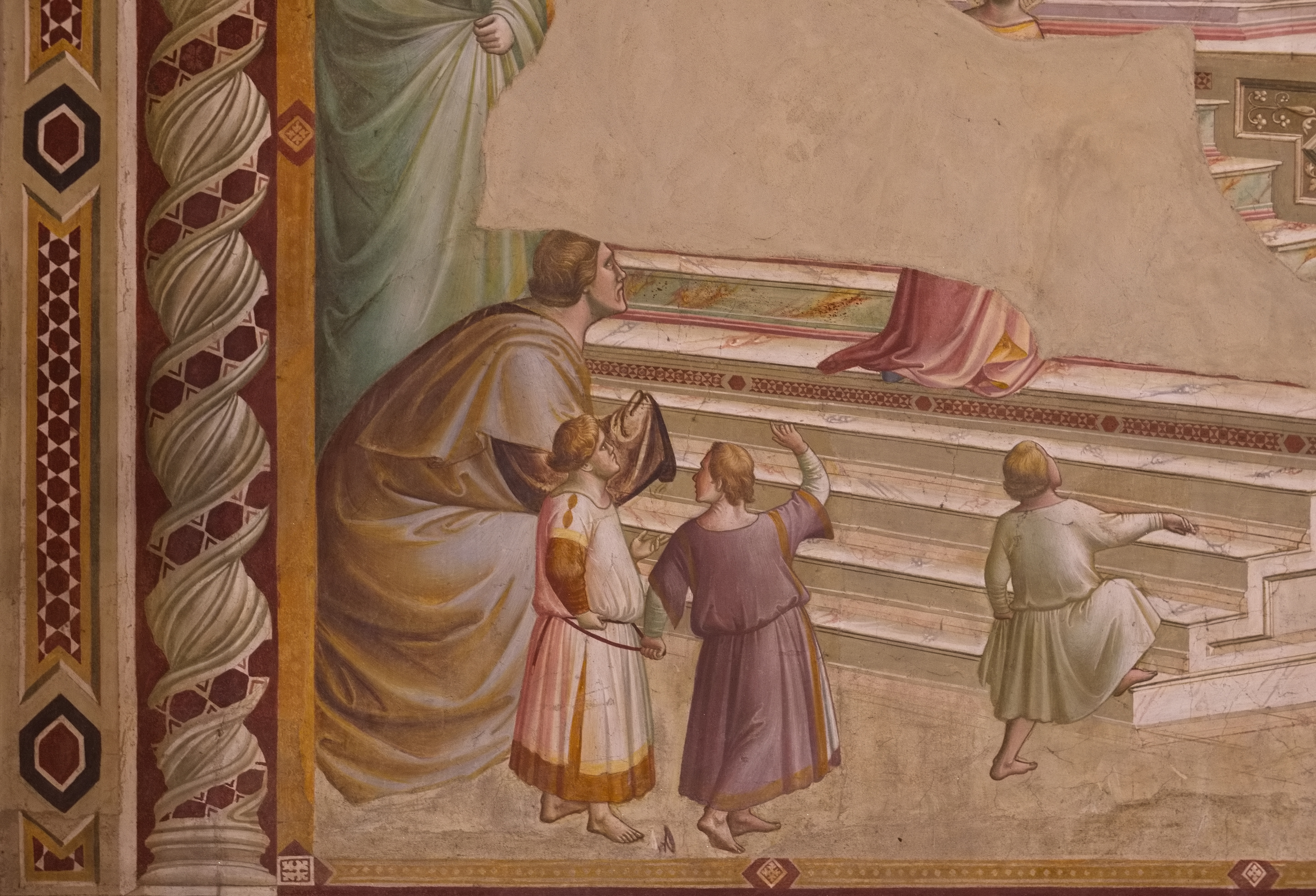
Presentation of Mary, detail (north wall)

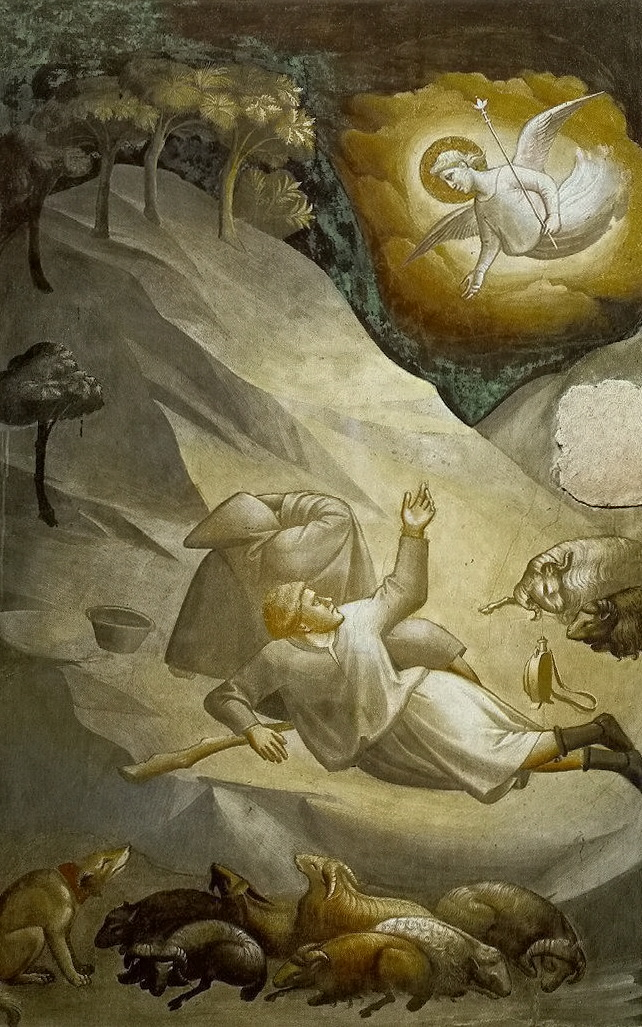
Annunciation to the Shepherds (east wall)

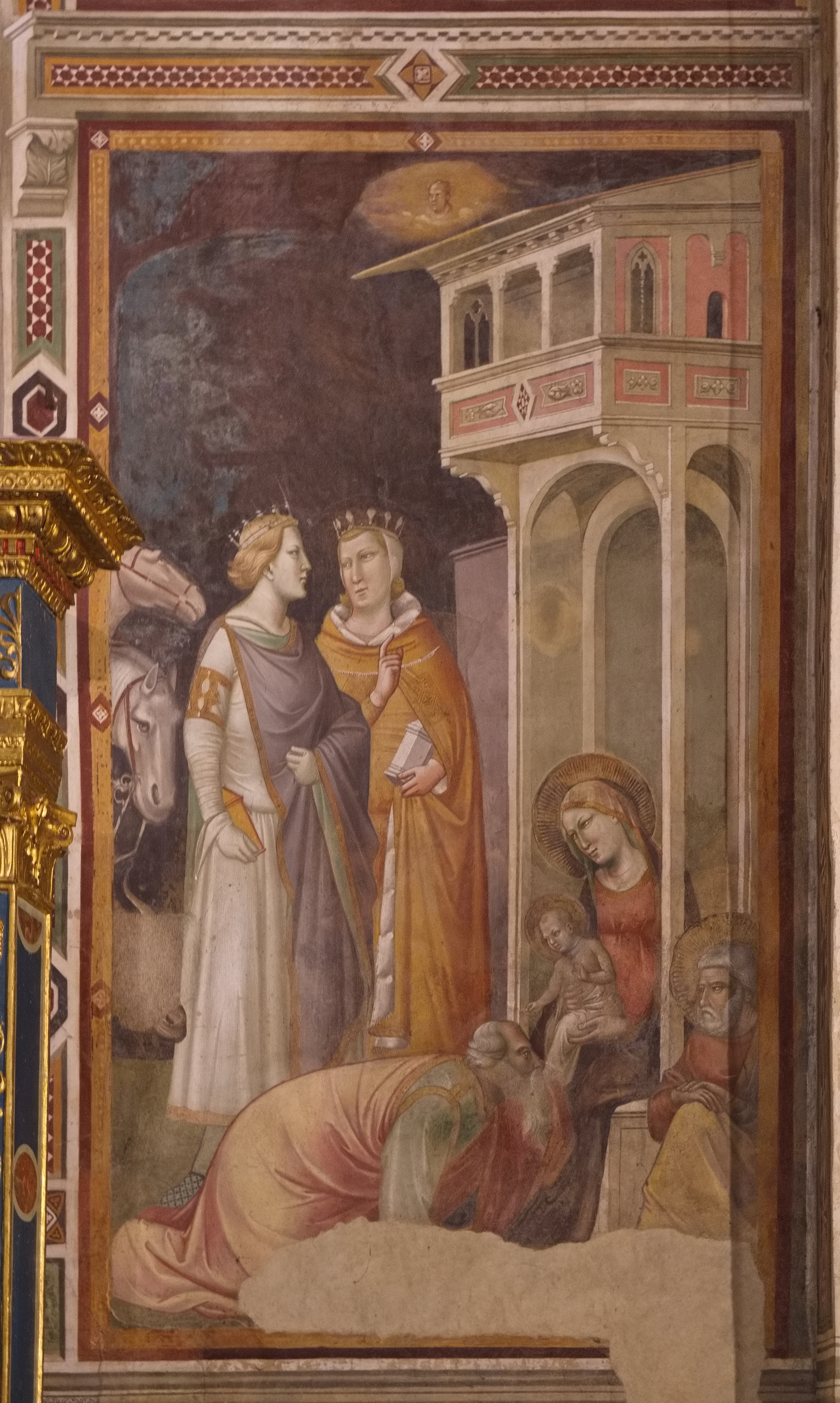
Adoration of the Magi (east wall)

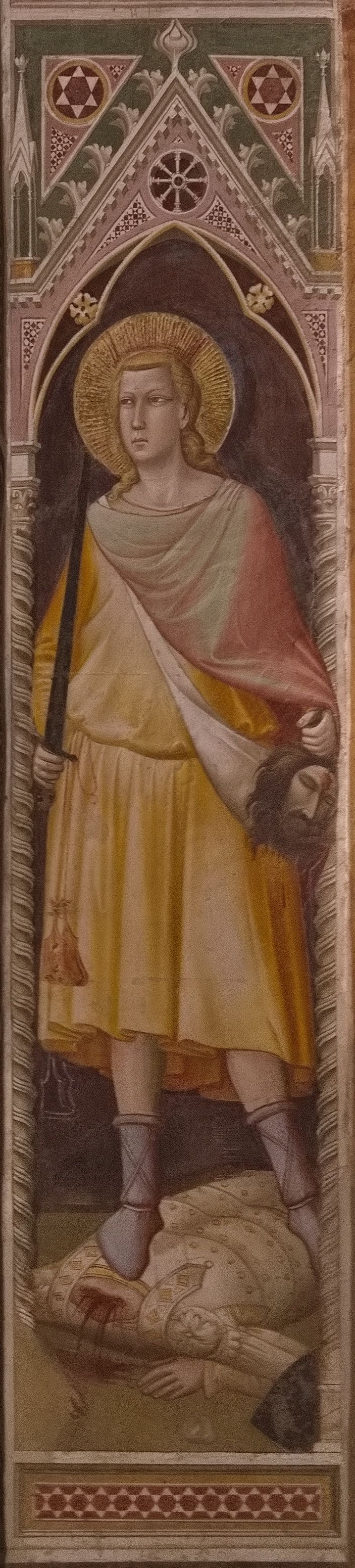
David (with the Head of Goliath) (east wall column)

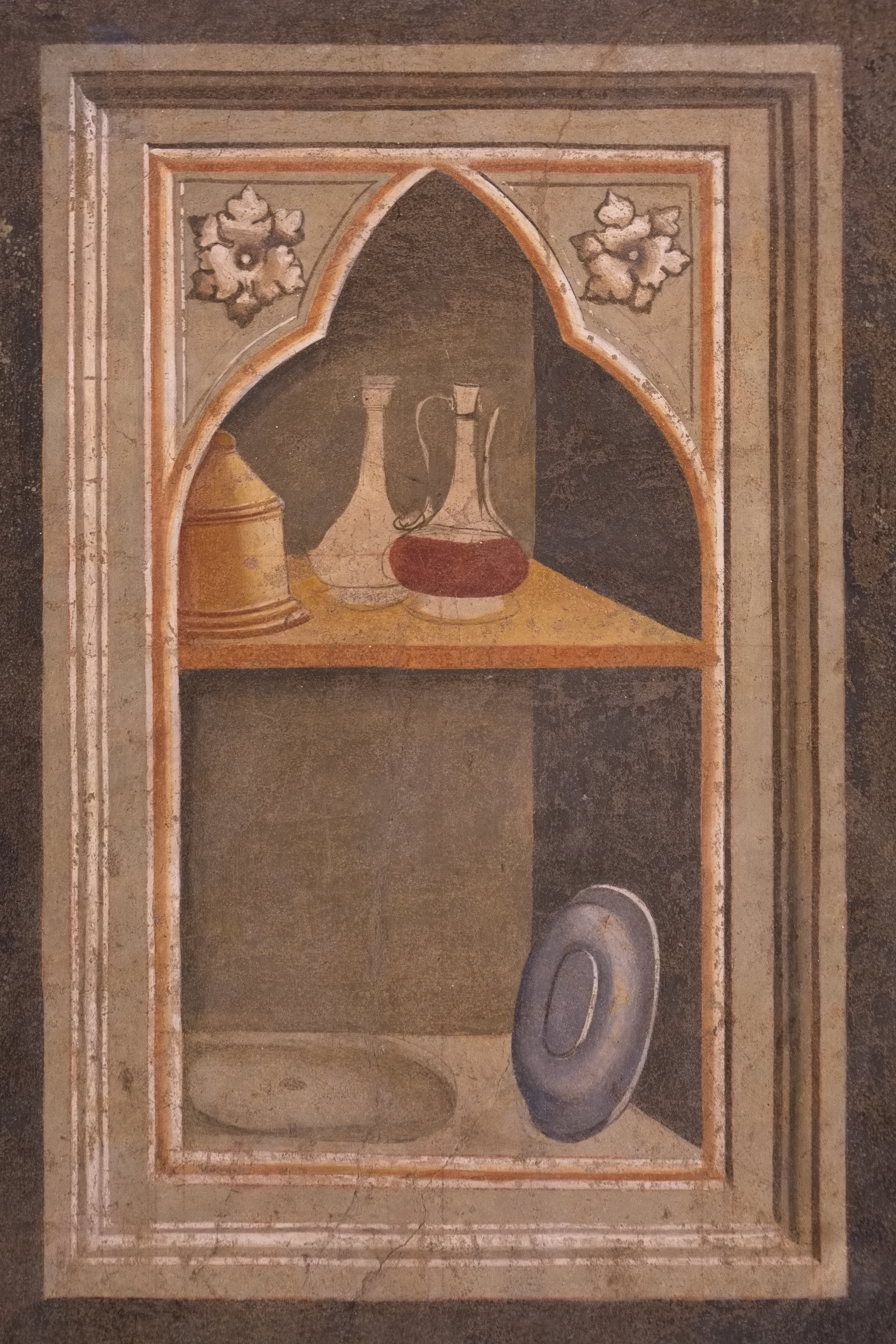
Fresco decoration beneath the narrative cycle (north wall)

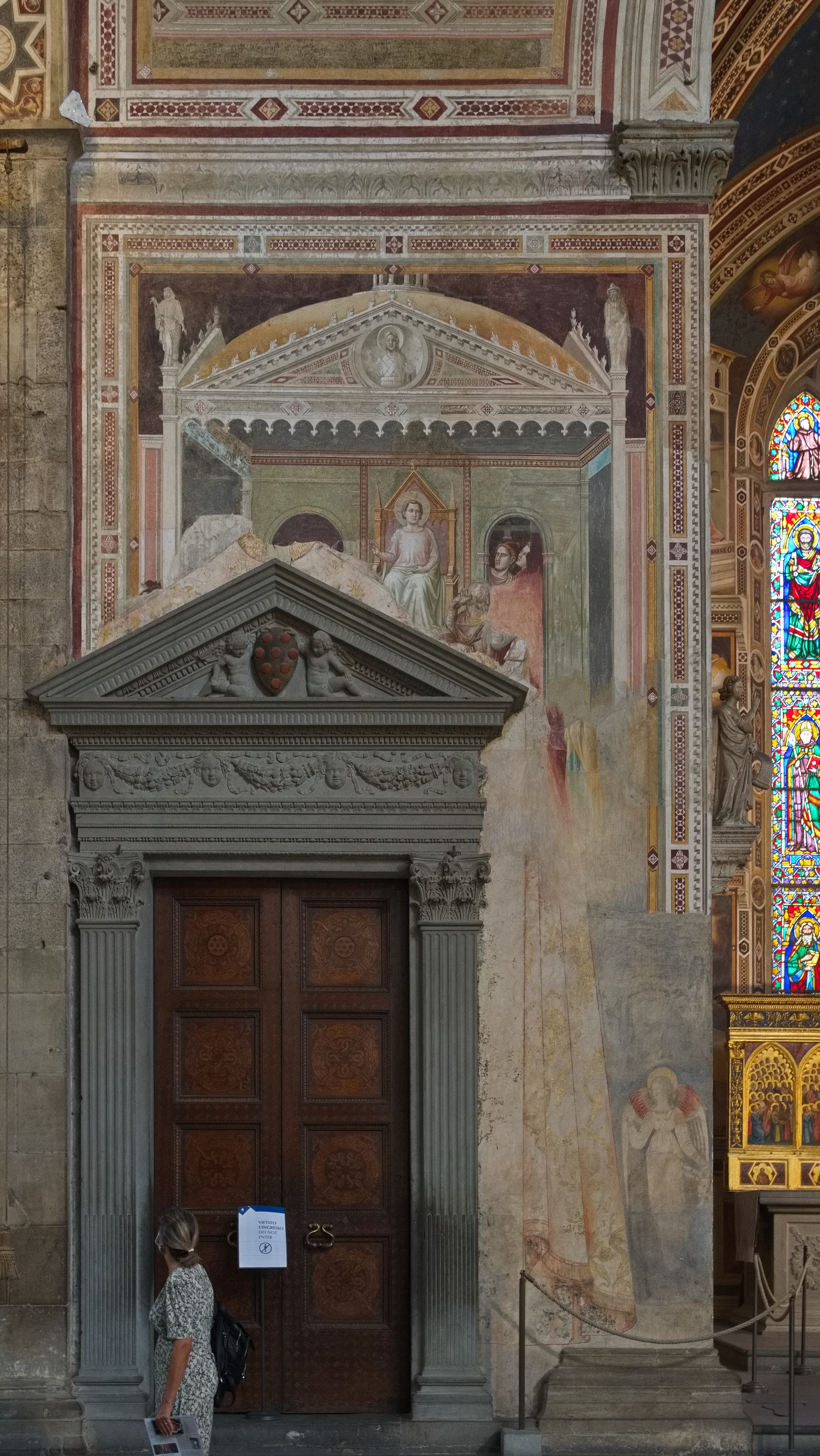
Fresco remains by Taddeo Gaddi on the left-hand side of the chapel, superimposed by the Giorgio Vasari's High Renaissance architecture

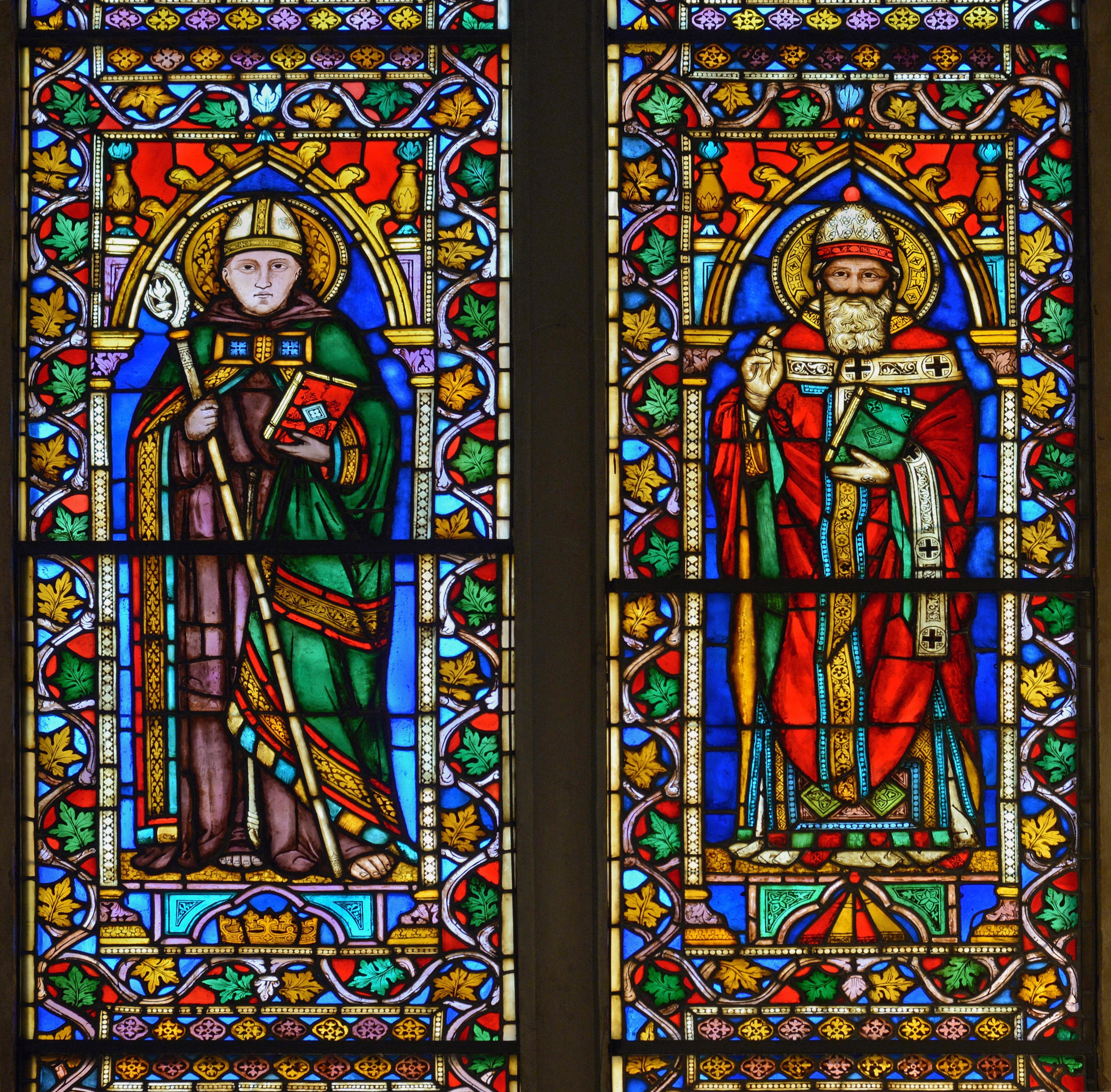
Two Prophets in the centre of the stained glass window designed by Taddeo Gaddi

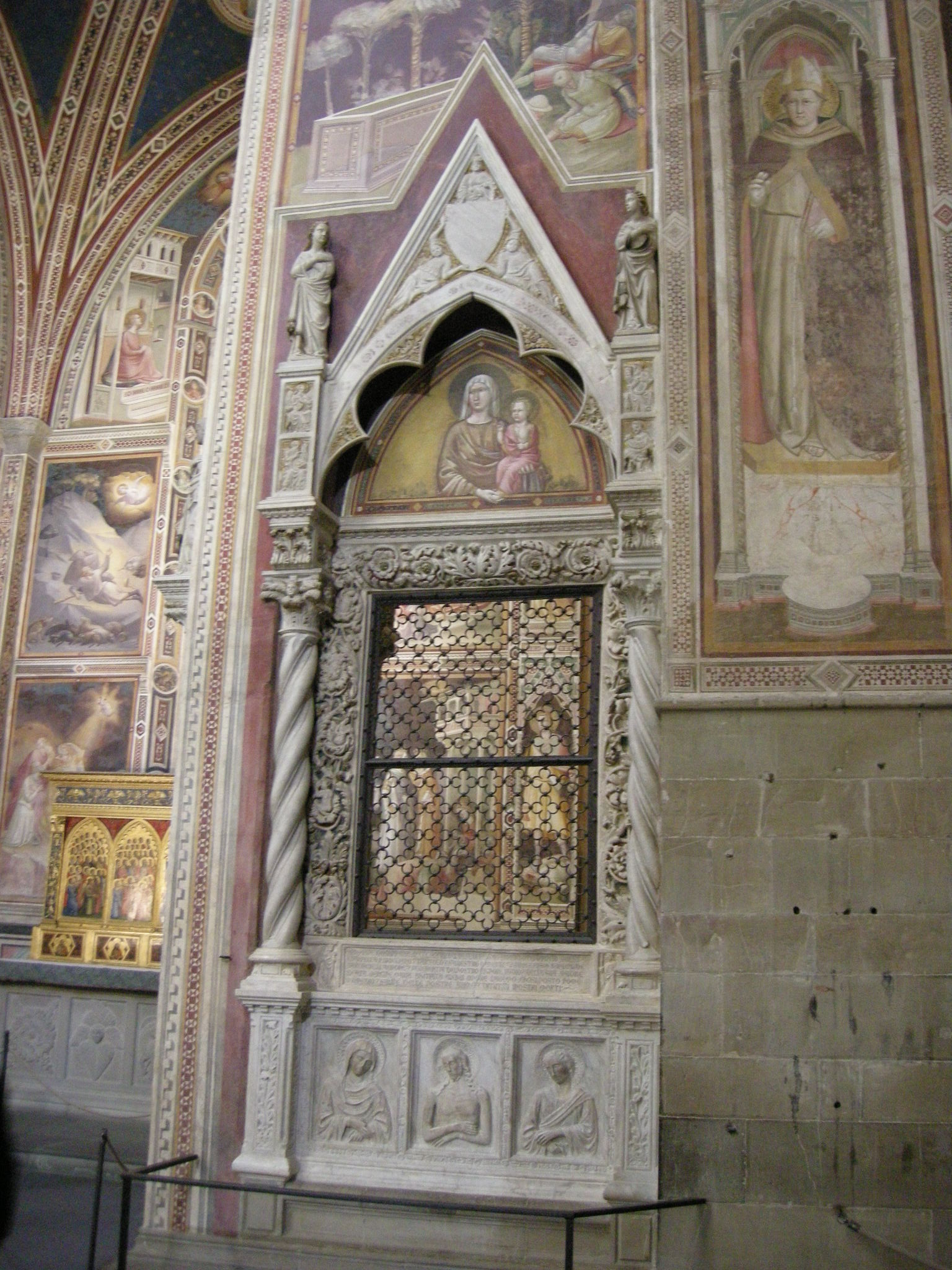
The Baroncelli family tomb
