= Girdle of Thomas =

Christian relic in the form of a belt

Coordinates: 43.8820°N 11.0978°E

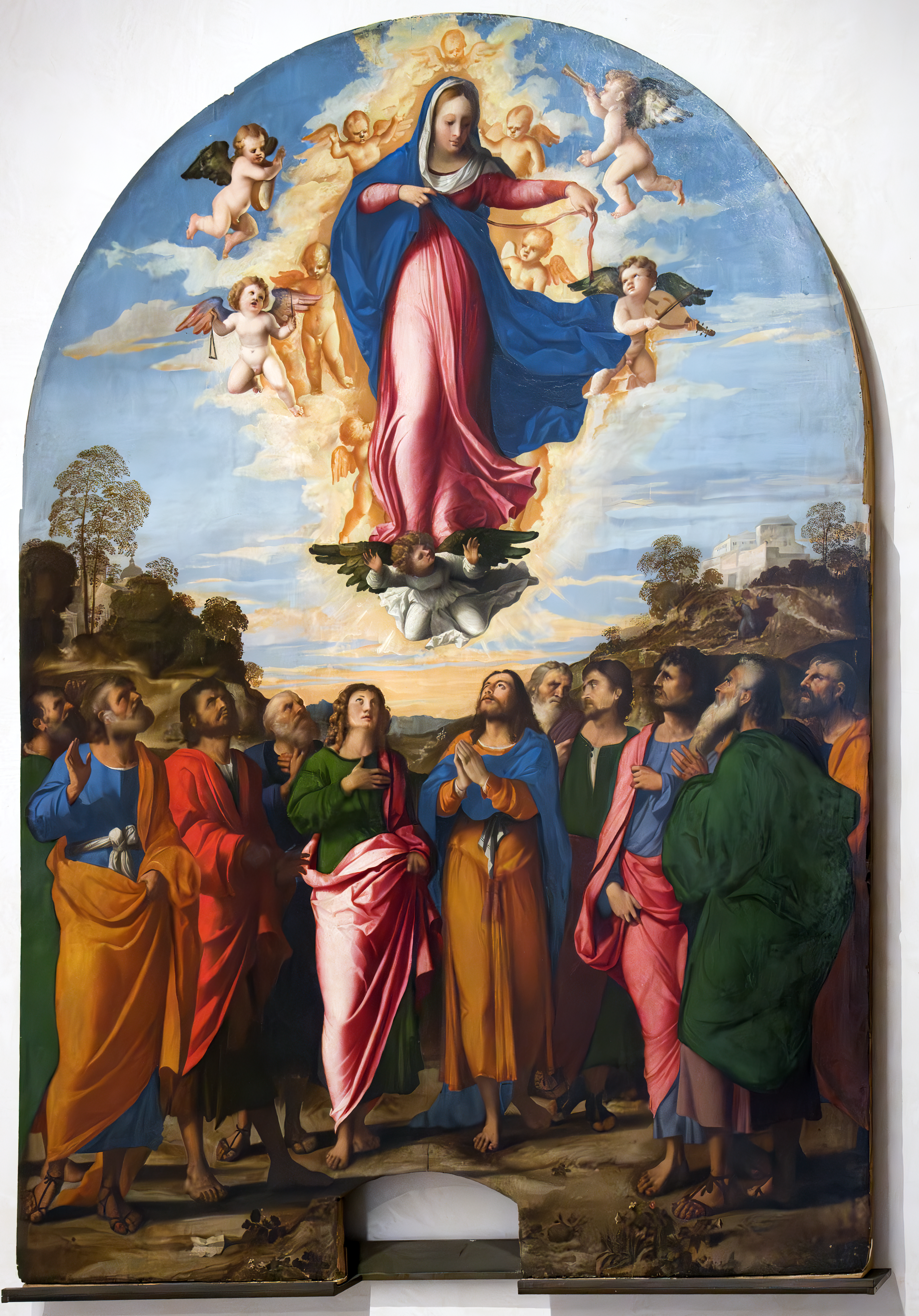
Palma Vecchio, Assumption of Mary, who is removing her belt as Thomas (above the head of the apostle in green) hurries to the scene

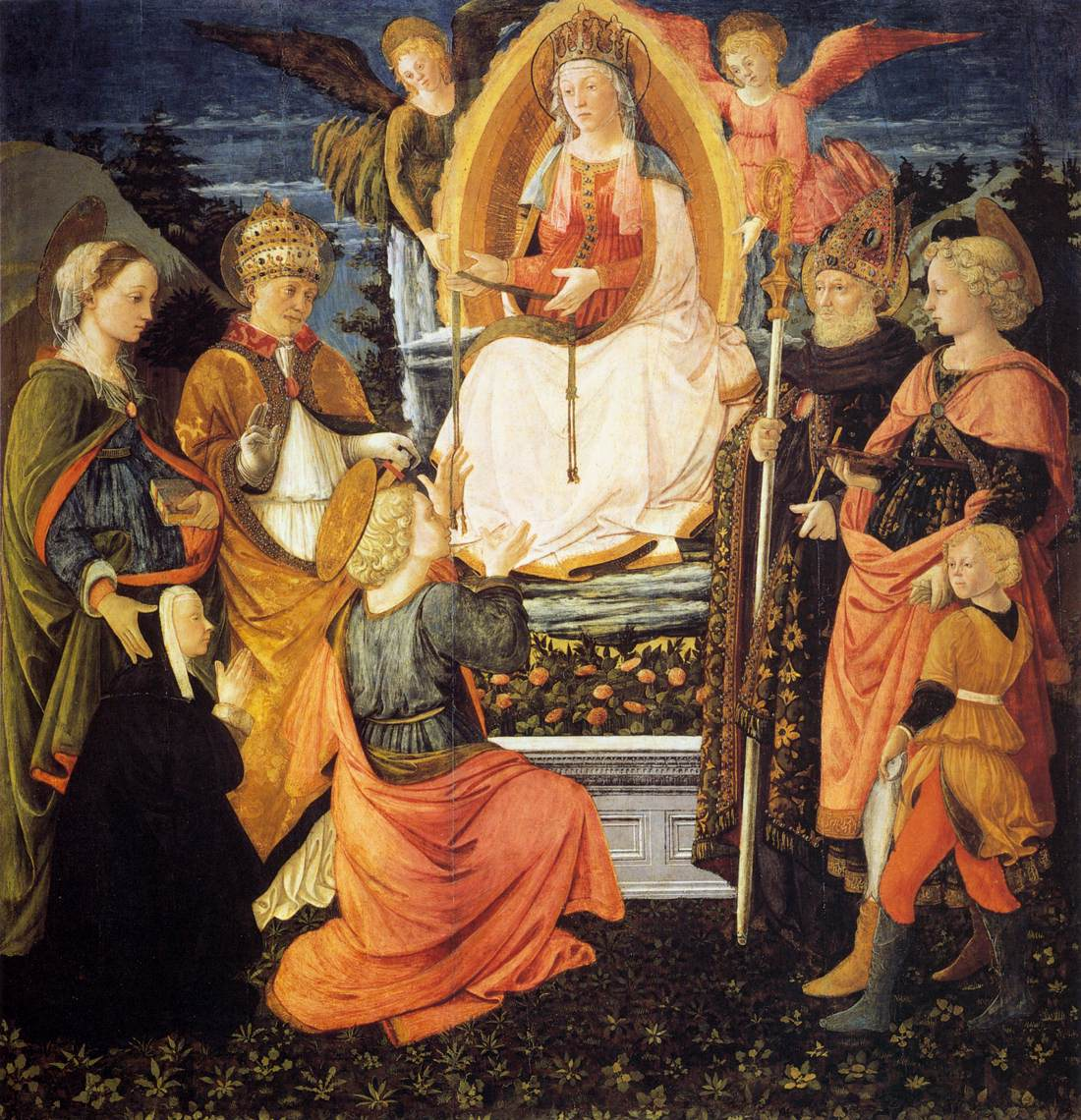
Filippo Lippi, Madonna della Cintola, 1455–1465, Prato

The Girdle of Thomas, Virgin's Girdle, Holy Belt, or Sacra Cintola in modern Italian, is a Christian relic in the form of a "girdle" or knotted textile cord used as a belt, that according to a medieval legend was dropped by the Virgin Mary from the sky to Saint Thomas the Apostle at or around the time of the Assumption of Mary to Heaven. The supposed original girdle is a relic belonging to Prato Cathedral in Tuscany, Italy and its veneration has been regarded as especially helpful for pregnant women. The story was frequently depicted in the art of Florence and the whole of Tuscany, and the keeping and display of the relic at Prato generated commissions for several important artists of the early Italian Renaissance. The Prato relic has outlasted several rivals in Catholic hands, and is the Catholic equivalent of the various relics held by Eastern Christianity: the Cincture of the Theotokos of the Eastern Orthodox Church and the Holy Girdle of the Syriac Orthodox Church.

== Legend ==
The legend of Thomas's girdle probably originated in the East, and was well known in Italy by the 14th century. Thomas is most famous, apart from his mission to India, for the Doubting Thomas episode (John 20, John 20:24–29) where he missed the post-Resurrection appearance of Jesus to the ten other apostles, and said he would not believe Jesus had returned until he had felt his wounds. In the story of the girdle, at the Assumption of Mary, where the other apostles were present, Thomas once again missed the occasion (being on his way back from India), so the Virgin Mary, aware of Thomas' sceptical nature, appeared to him individually and dropped the girdle she was wearing down onto him, to give him a physical proof of what he had seen. In other versions he was miraculously transported from India to the Mount of Olives, to be present at the actual Assumption, and the Virgin dropped her girdle down to him as she was taken up to heaven. Alternatively, only Thomas actually witnessed the Assumption, and the Virgin left the belt as a proof for his story to the other apostles (a neat inversion of the Doubting Thomas episode).

The legend is described briefly in the Golden Legend, with Thomas missing the Assumption and receiving the girdle later, and is, uniquely among the surviving English medieval mystery plays, covered in the York Mystery Cycle. The belt or girdle was a common symbol of chastity, and for example Saint Thomas Aquinas had been given one by angels after sexual temptation.

== In art ==
After Florence, only a few miles away, took control of Prato in 1350–51, the girdle begins to feature in Florentine art and to be shown worn by figures of Madonna del Parto, iconic figures showing the Virgin Mary when pregnant.

The simplest version of the story, known as the Madonna of the Girdle (Madonna della Cintola) in art, shows in its basic form the Virgin in the sky and Thomas on the ground, with the girdle being dropped or handed down. Usually Thomas is in front of the empty sarcophagus that had been occupied by the Virgin, sometimes now with flowers growing in it. In more elaborate versions angels, saints, and donor portraits can be present. The version of the legend where Thomas is the only apostle to see the actual Assumption means that such images may legitimately be titled as Assumptions, which they often are. Lost versions by both Botticelli and Perugino (in the Sistine Chapel), are known from drawings.

The incident also appears in many works showing the Assumption with the other apostles, where Thomas is catching the falling girdle, or has received the girdle and holds it, as in the Oddi Altarpiece by Raphael and Titian's Assumption in Verona Cathedral. He also holds the girdle in the Madonna della Cintola (often called an "Assumption") by Pinturicchio in the Borgia Apartments in the Vatican Palace (1492–1494), where he is the only apostle. An altarpiece by Palma Vecchio, now in the Brera Gallery in Milan, shows an intermediate version, with Thomas in the distance hurrying towards the other apostles, and the Virgin taking off her girdle.

Prato, slightly to the north of Florence, was intended to provide a defence of the larger city against attacks from the north. Prato was taken over by Florence during a war with Milan, just before an invasion of Tuscany by Giovanni Visconti da Oleggio in 1351, when the newly garrisoned Prato was by-passed and Florence itself besieged, before the siege was abandoned on the Feast of the Assumption. This was a huge relief, as most Florentine troops were garrisoning Pistoia and Prato. It has been suggested that this nervous time, and the date of the lifting of the siege, stimulated the significant number of Florentine commissions of art involving the story of the girdle in the years immediately following. The most notable and influential of these is the over life-size marble relief on the rear wall of the huge "tabernacle" shrine of the Orsanmichele by Andrea Orcagna of 1352–1359. In 1402 Gian Galeazzo Visconti, Duke of Milan again invaded Florentine territory and the relic was processed round the city to protect it, and indeed he did not attack. Whether such a procession also happened in 1351 is unclear.

== Gallery ==
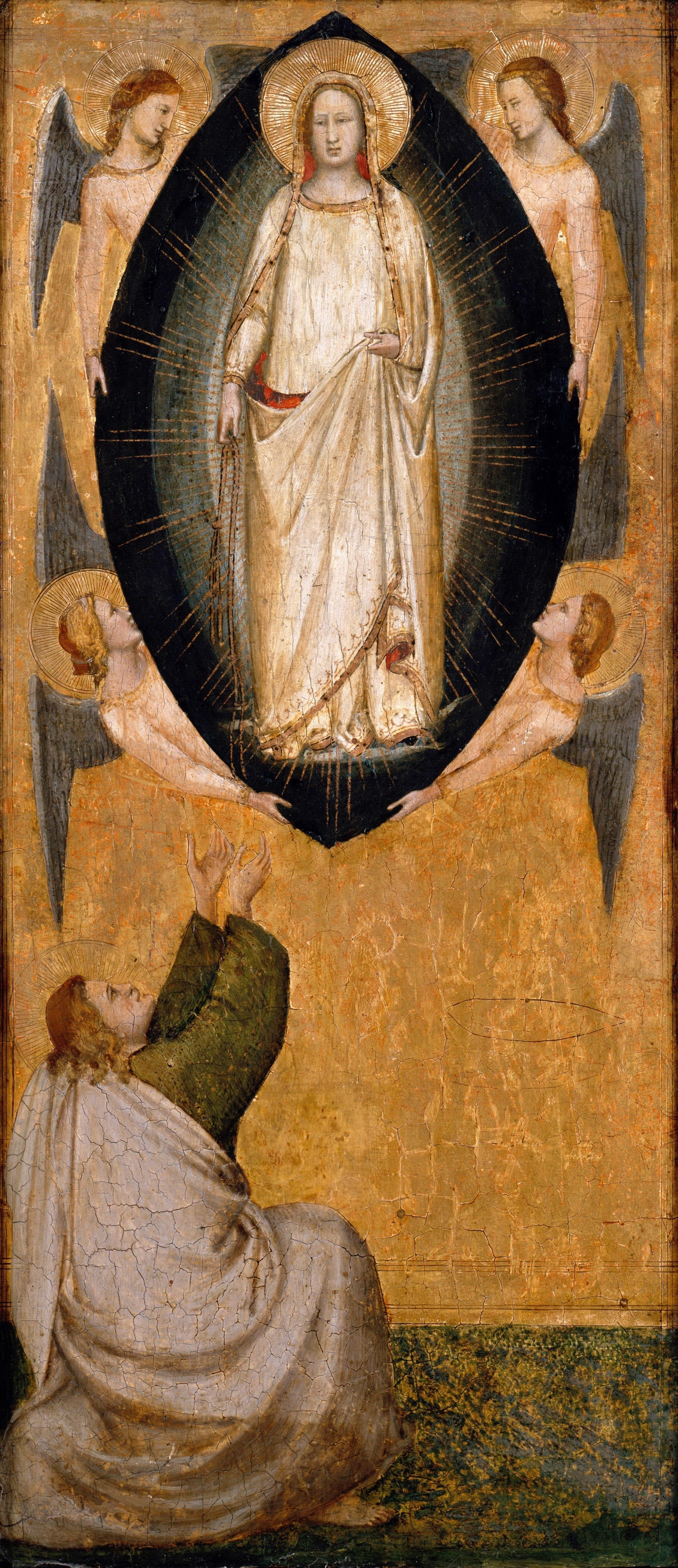
Maso di Banco, Descent of Mary's Girdle to the Apostle Thomas, 1337-1339, Berlin. The girdle hangs down from the virgin's hand.

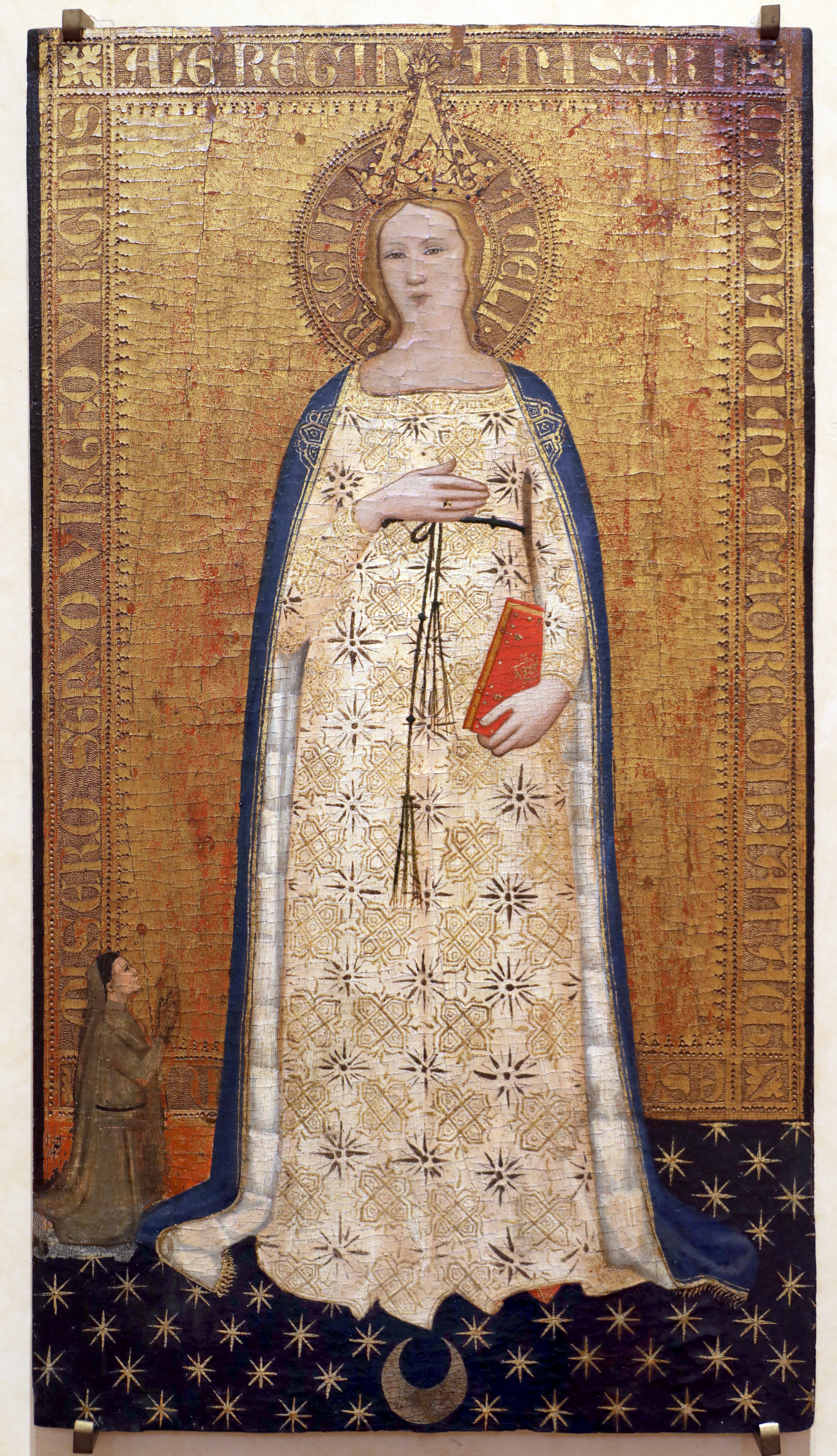
Nardo di cione, Madonna del parto and donor, 1355-1360

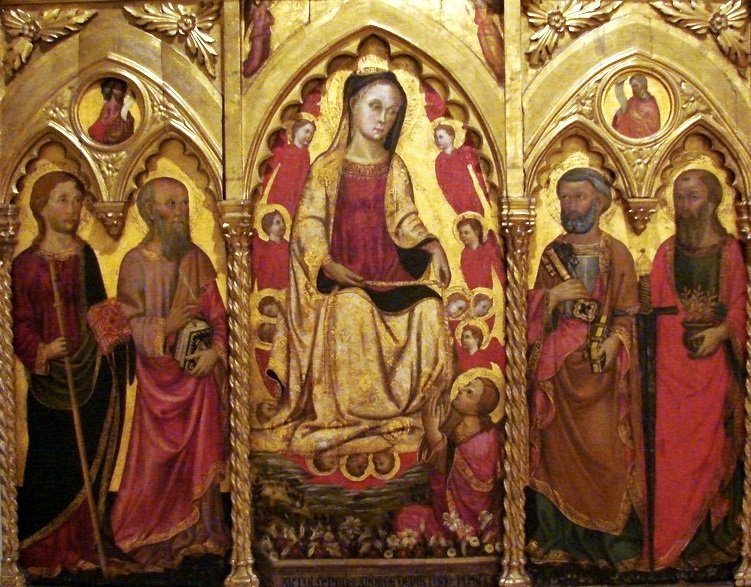
Madonna enthroned with angels and apostles, including Thomas and the girdle in the centre panel

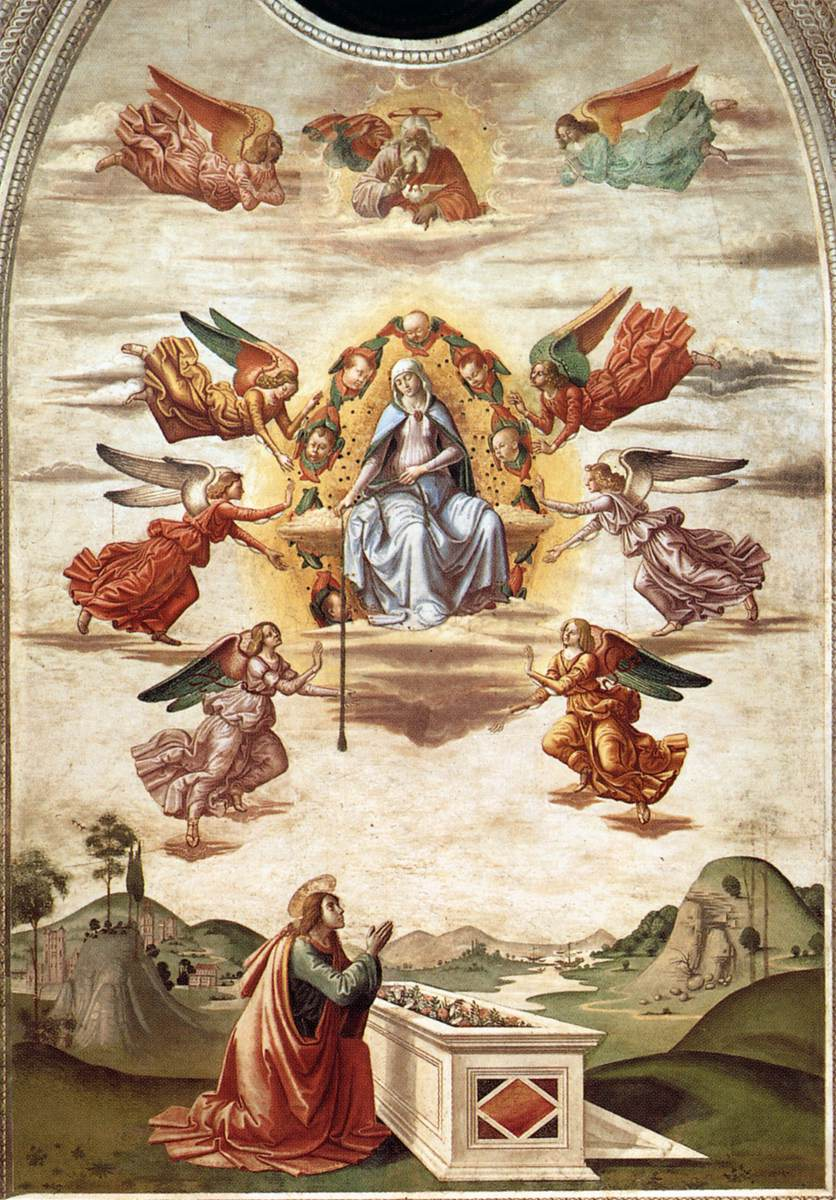
Sebastiano Mainardi, Assumption of the Virgin with the Gift of the Girdle, 15th century, Baroncelli Chapel

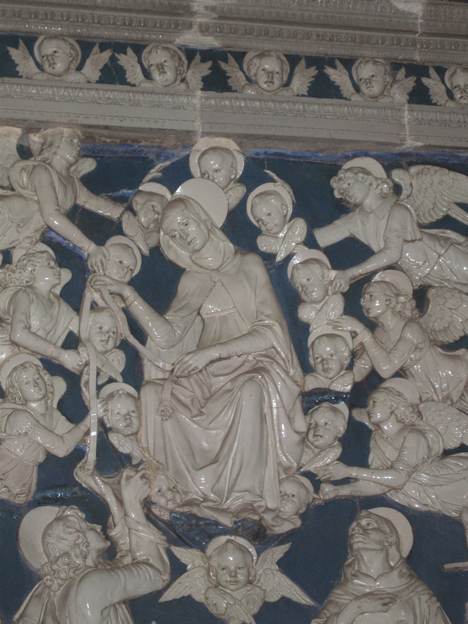
Andrea della Robbia, terracotta relief

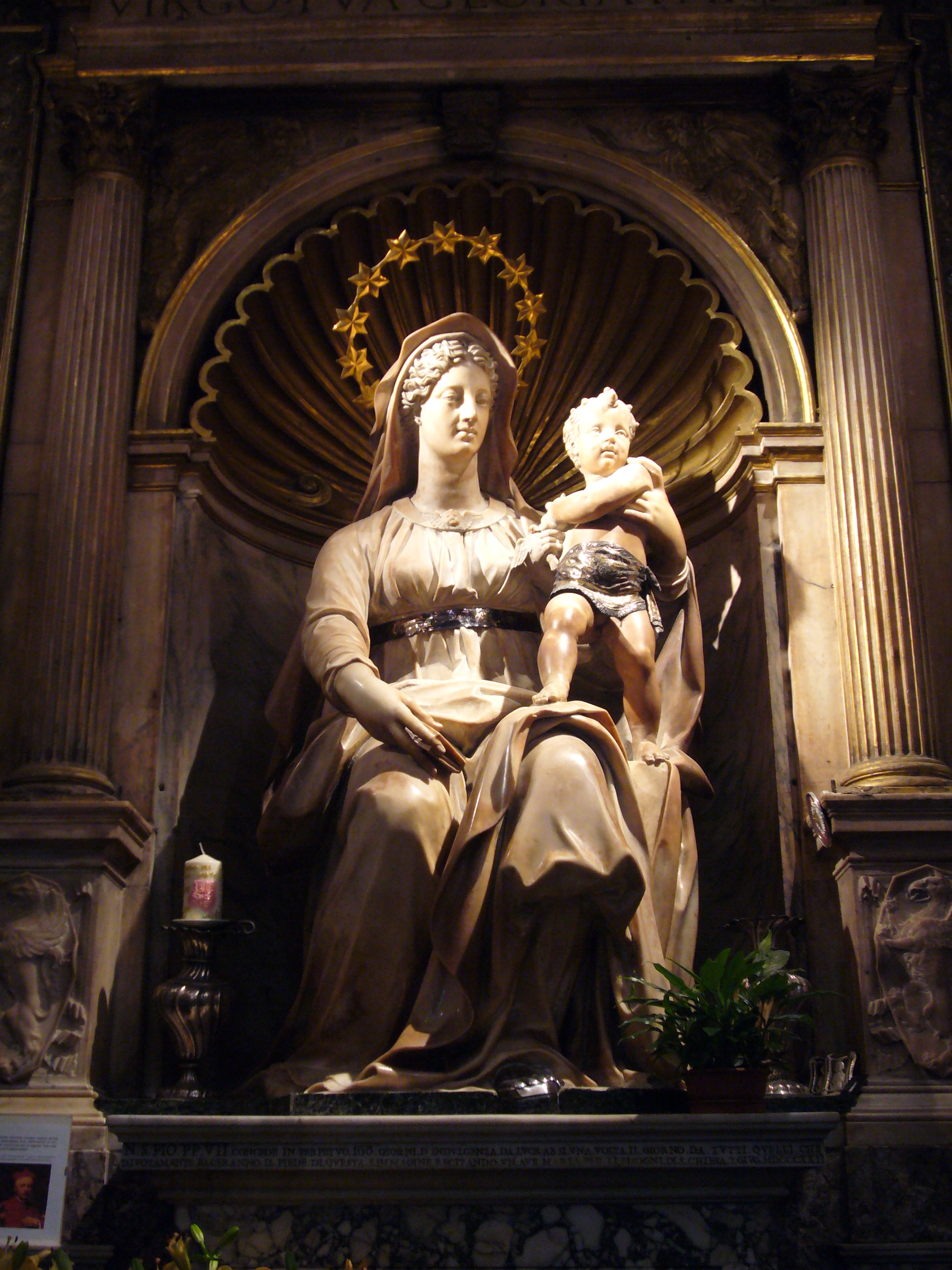
Sansovino, a Madonna del Parto, here including the Child, with a prominent belt.

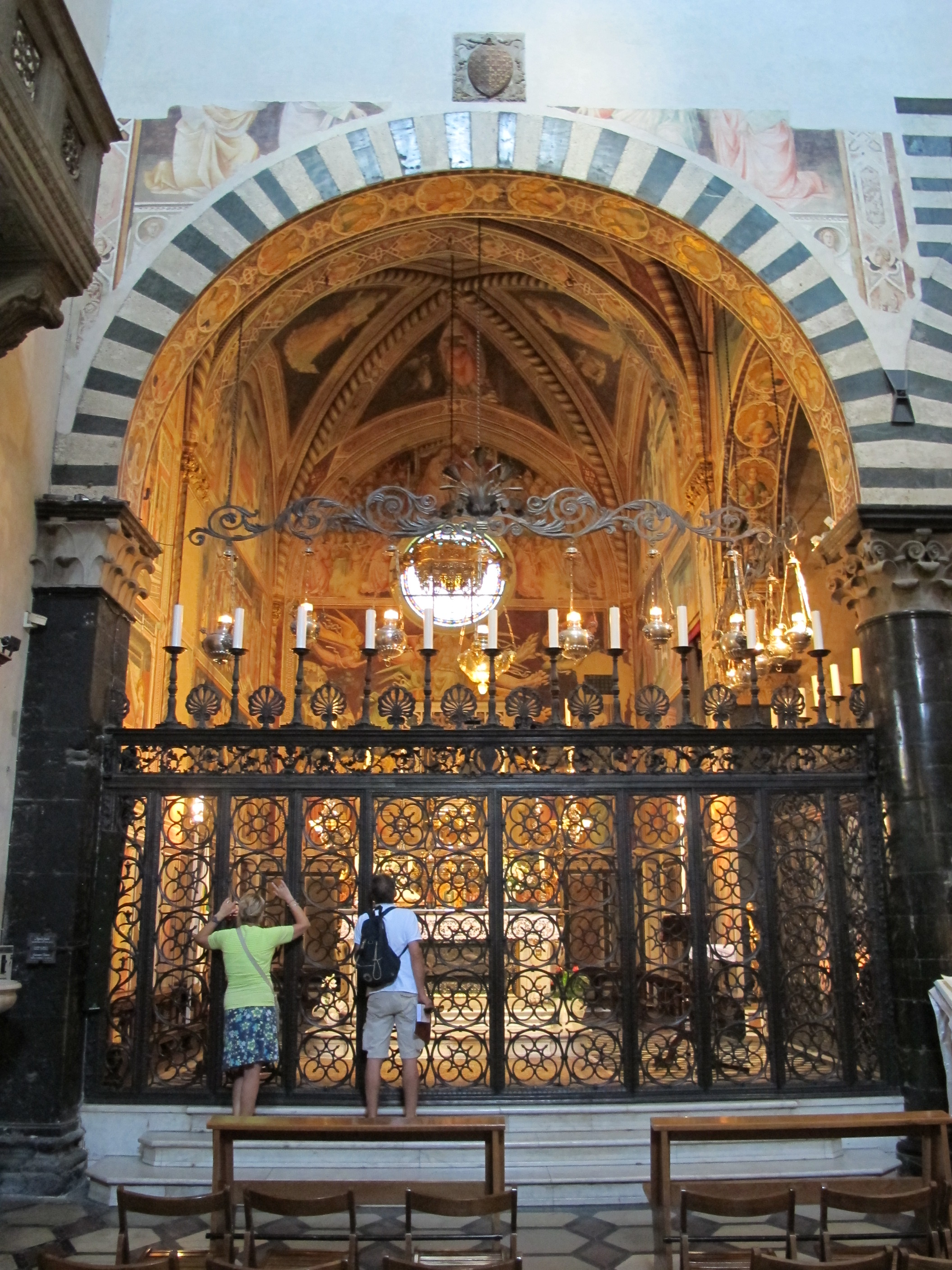
Cappella del sacro cingolo in Prato Cathedral

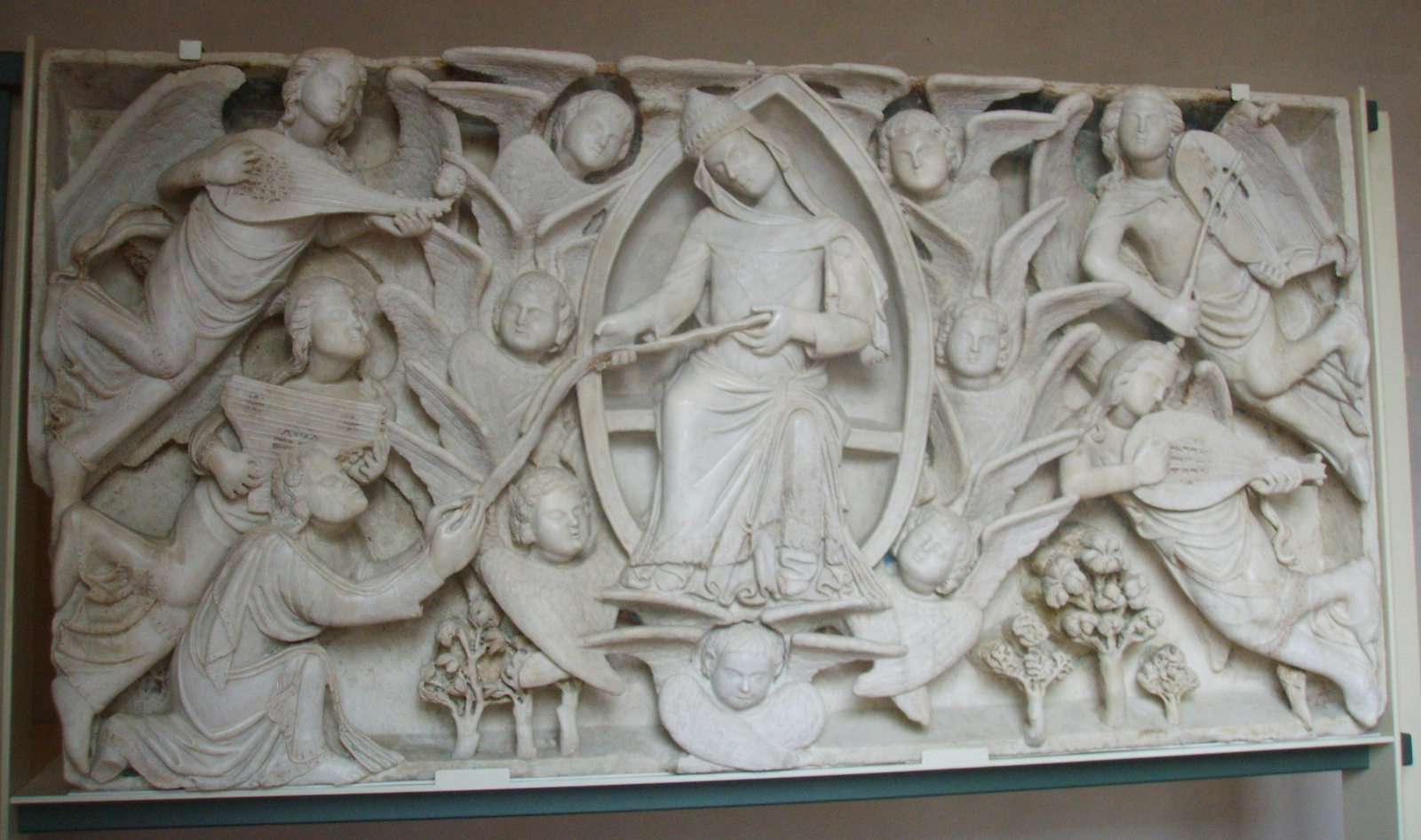
14th century relief in the museum, perhaps from the first pulpit built to display the relic

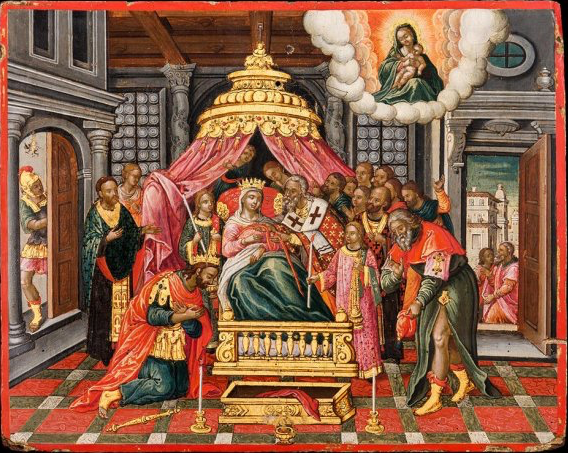
The Miracle of the Holy Belt, Theodore Poulakis

=== Art for the Prato relic ===
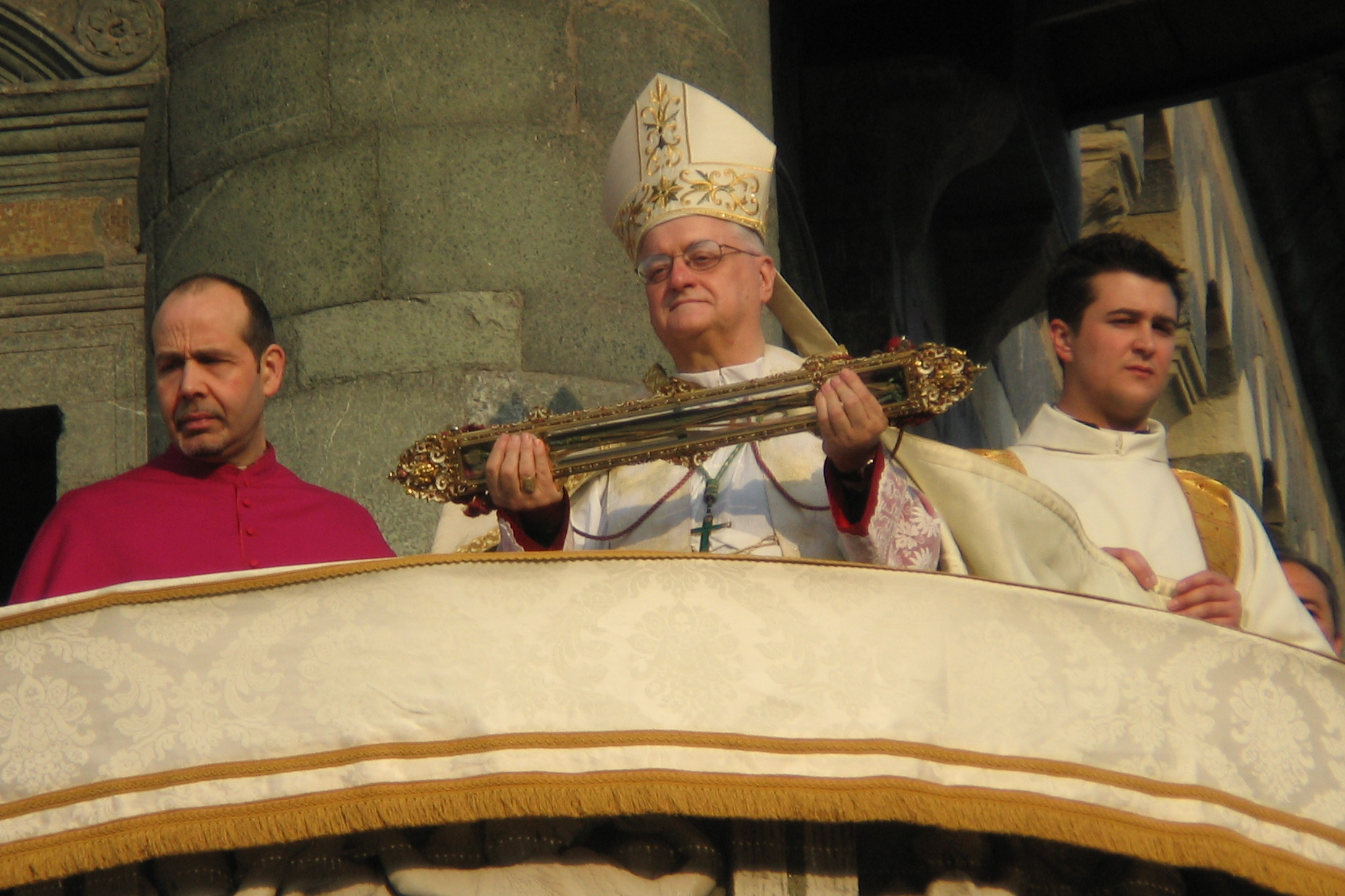
The Prato girdle displayed in 2007 from the Donatello pulpit.

The Prato relic is kept in a reliquary in the Cappella del Sacro Cingolo in Prato Cathedral, and still exhibited five times annually, on the birthday of the Virgin Mary on September 8 and other feast days. In the Middle Ages the display coincided with the three days of the Prato (trading) fair, and was accompanied by elaborate civic ceremonies and festivities. After 1348, matters relating to the relic were controlled by the Opera del Sacro Cingolo, a four-man lay body elected by the city council, who retained one third of the revenues collected from the pilgrims to the relic to fund their work.

Following an attempted theft in 1312 and growing numbers of pilgrims, the city decided they needed to build a new chapel for the cathedral to hold the relic, which was previously kept in the cathedral choir. The new chapel is at the west end of the left aisle, near the main door. It begins with a screened-off area under the first arch of the nave, but extends back into a new section built out of the side wall of the cathedral. Completing the chapel took the rest of the century, and the girdle was finally installed on Easter Sunday in 1395. The chapel has frescoes of Stories of the Virgin and the Cintola by Agnolo Gaddi (1392–1395). The 18th-century altar, which encloses the Cintola, is crowned by a marble Madonna with Child (c. 1301), considered one of Giovanni Pisano's masterpieces.

Presumably because the Prato relic has always been kept folded in a reliquary, and there are many rival relics, it is noticeable that the Tuscan artists depicting it cannot agree as to its precise form, but several knots along its length and tasselled or divided ends are common features.

Two successive pulpits for the public display of the relic in Prato were built, the first was apparently inside the cathedral and is now gone, but was probably decorated with the 14th century reliefs now in the cathedral's museum. The second was built outside, projecting from a corner of the cathedral, in the 1430s by Donatello and Michelozzo, with a relief frieze of putti. This is very high, and does not allow a close view of the relic when it is displayed. This pulpit is still used today, though the rather worn original reliefs have been moved to the museum and replaced by copies. The museum also has the reliquary by Maso di Bartolomeo of 1446–47, decorated with putti' matching the outside pulpit; he also made the very fine Renaissance metalwork screens closing off two sides of the Cintola chapel from the aisle, which were partly paid for by the Medici. A later glass and metal reliquary now houses the relic. The main pulpit inside the cathedral, for normal preaching, is decorated with reliefs by Donatello's pupil Antonio Rossellino and Mino da Fiesole and was completed in 1473. The central relief panel is a Madonna della Cintola. The main altarpiece of the cathedral, installed in 1338, had been the same scene, probably by Bernardo Daddi, from which the main panel is now lost, and the cathedral still contains other painted and terracotta relief representations by Ridolfo Ghirlandaio and others.

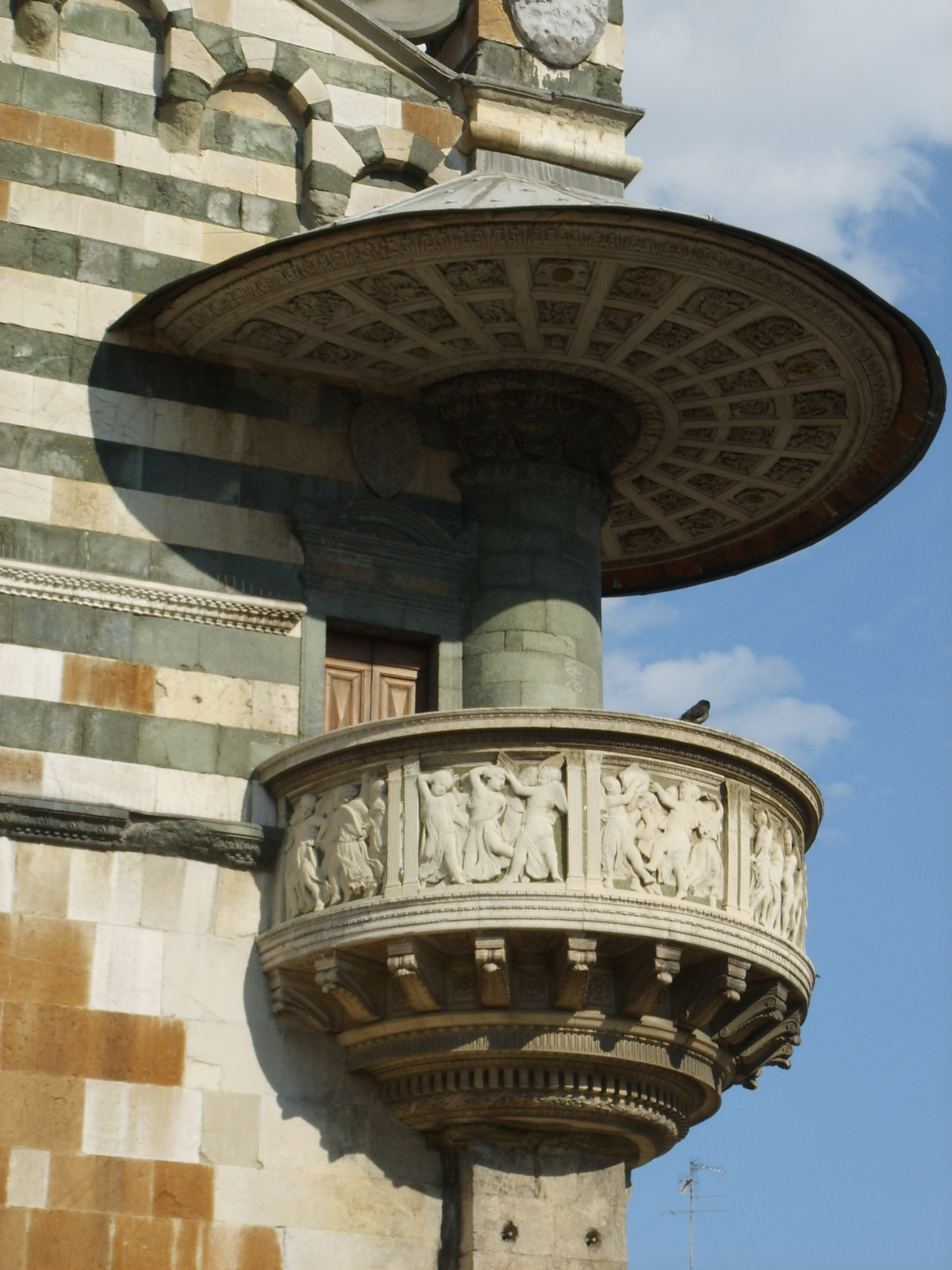
The outside pulpit at Prato by Donatello and Michelozzo, 1430s

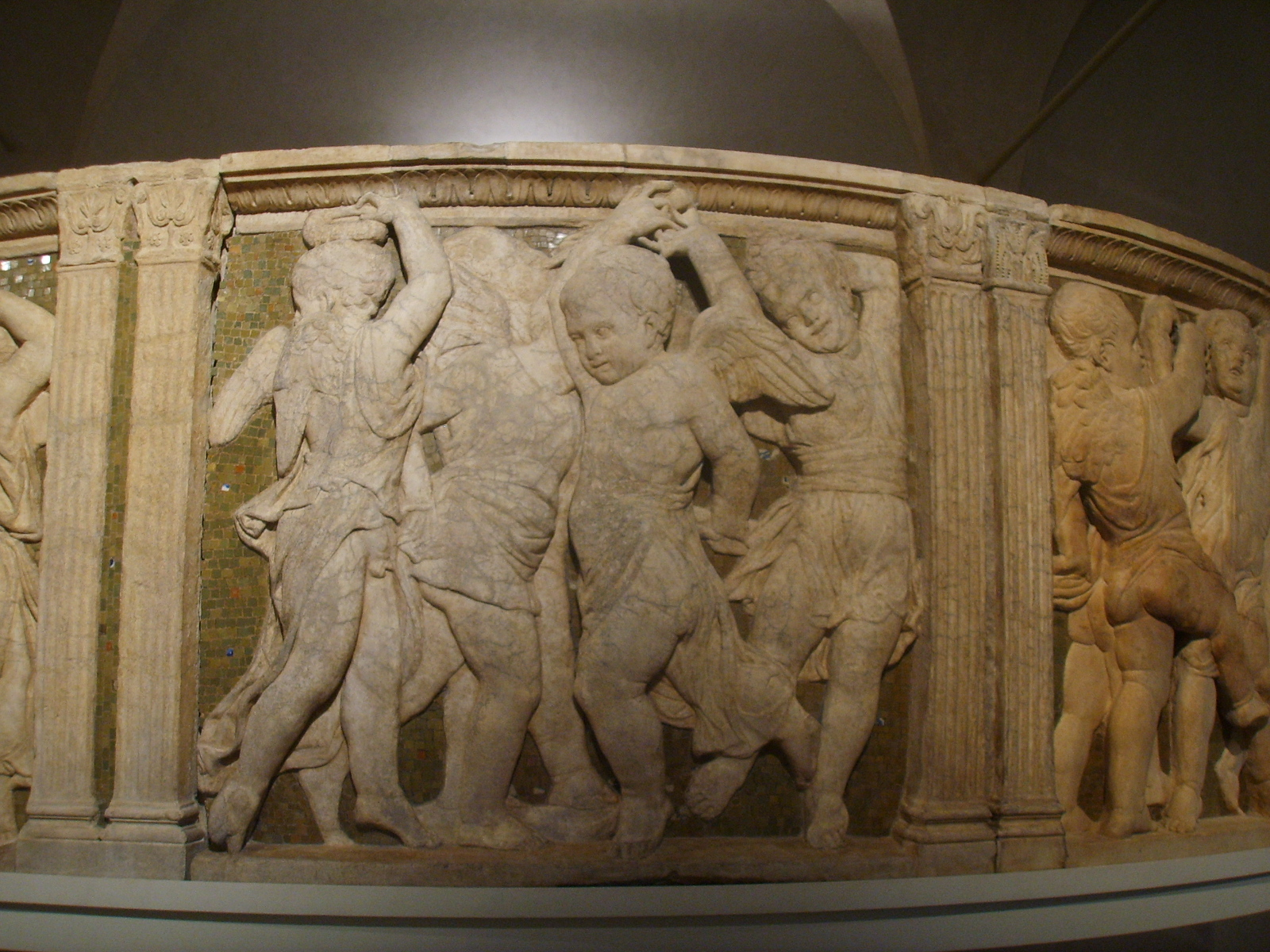
Detail of the original pulpit reliefs in the cathedral museum

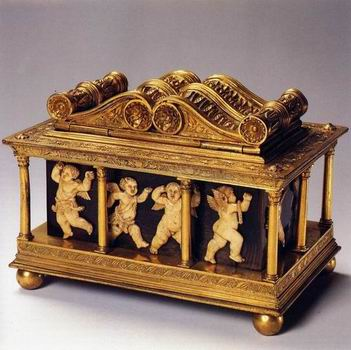
Reliquary of 1446-7 for the Prato Girdle, now in the Diocesan Museum, by Maso di Bartolomeo

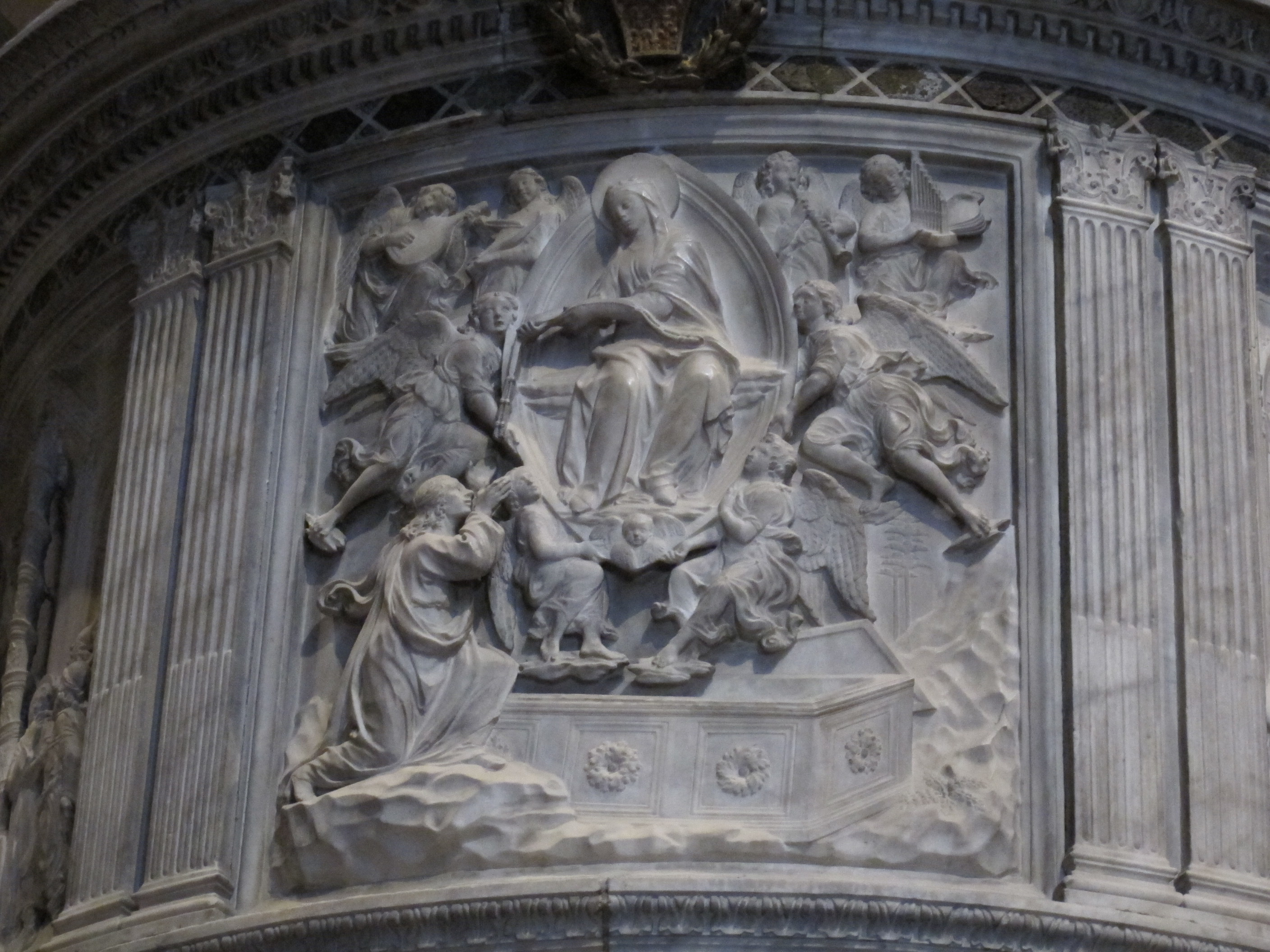
Madonna della Cintola on the pulpit by Antonio Rossellino and Mino da Fiesole, completed 1473.

== Other relics ==
There were a number of supposed original girdle relics across the ancient Christian world, partly conflated with tertiary relics (belts that had touched the supposed genuine belt) – Elizabeth of York, queen of Henry VII of England, bought one of these from a friar to help her pregnancy, and there was an "original" at Westminster Abbey in London. The Prato girdle was much the most reputed in the Western church, and had a legendary provenance involving a Prato merchant called Michele Dagomari who married a woman from Jerusalem who was the descendant of the Eastern Rite priest to whom Thomas had entrusted the relic before his risky mission to India. Conventional documentary records suggest the relic was in Prato by the 1270s and may have arrived there in 1194.

The Cincture of the Theotokos, long in the Church of St. Mary of Blachernae in Constantinople (Istanbul), and now in the Vatopedi monastery on Mount Athos, is the main equivalent relic of the Eastern Orthodox Church, drawing on the same legend. It is apparently made of camel hair and was embroidered in gold by the Byzantine Empress Zoe (978–1050).

The Syriac Orthodox Church still venerates a relic, the Holy Girdle (Holy Soonoro in Syriac), in Homs in Syria that is a section of a belt; it is kept in the Saint Mary Church of the Holy Belt, an ancient church that has been damaged during the Syrian civil war. Other sections are held in other churches.

Florence's great rival, Siena, acquired a competing girdle relic in 1359 for the hospital Santa Maria della Scala, and the Basilica of Our Lady, Maastricht had another.

== See also ==
- Confraternities of the Cord
- Girdle of Aphrodite
- Virgin's veil
