= Syriac Orthodox Archdiocese of Homs =

Archdiocese of Homs

Syriac orthodox Church
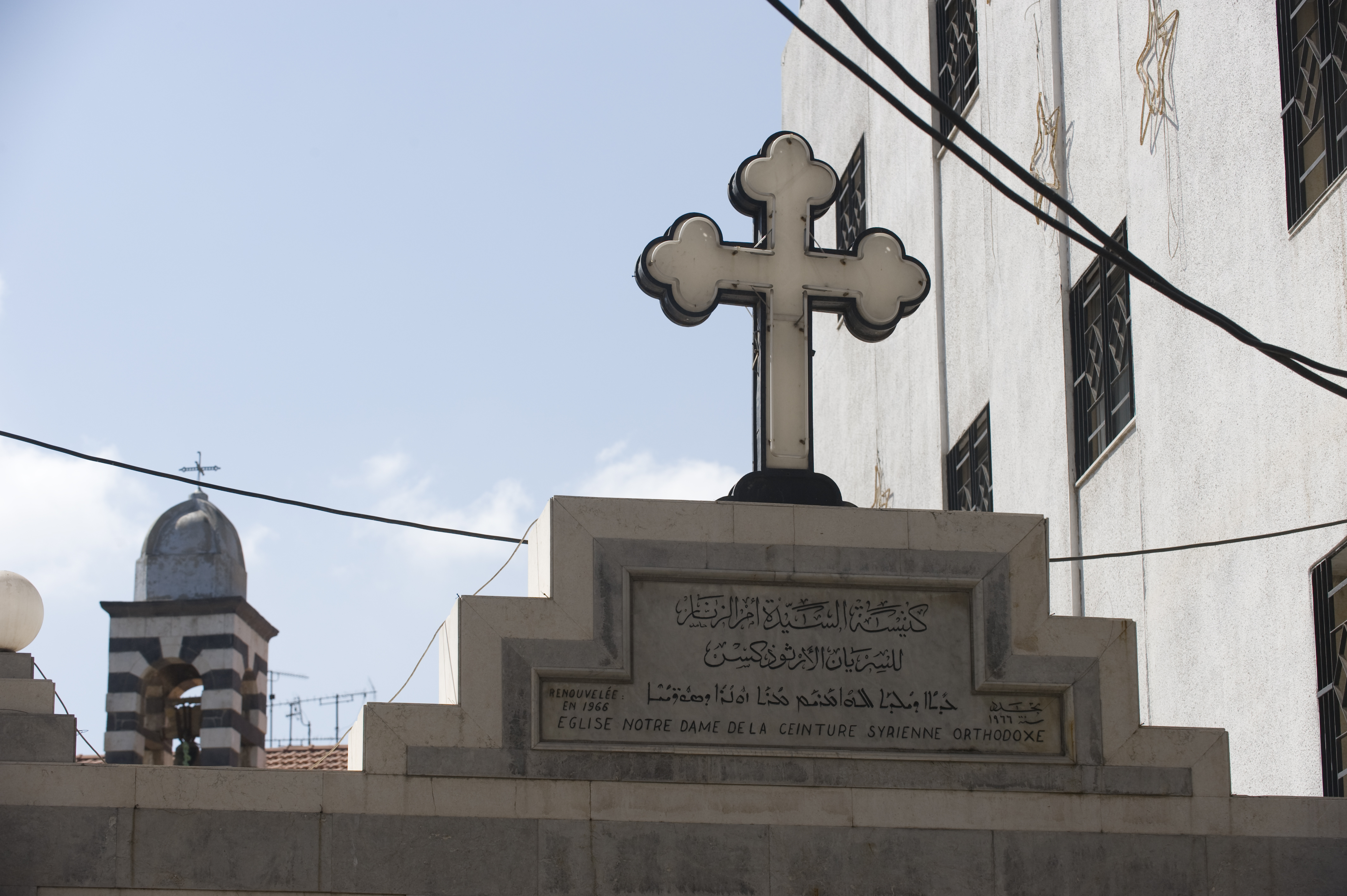
- Incumbent; Timotheos Matta Al-Khoury
- Style: Archbishop His Eminence

Information
- Cathedral: Saint Mary Church of the Holy Belt

Website
- https://syriacorthodoxofhoms.org/

The Syriac Orthodox Archdiocese of Homs, Hama, Tartous and environs is a nominally Metropolitan Archeparchy of the Syriac Orthodox Church. Its seat is Saint Mary Church of the Holy Belt Cathedral in Homs, Syria.

== History ==
The Syriac Orthodox Diocese of Homs, also known as Emesa, has a rich history dating back to the early centuries of Christianity. While specific details about its exact founding are limited, it is believed to have existed as a significant center of Syriac Christianity for centuries.

Bishop Julian of Ḥomṣ was among the non chalcedonian bishops banished with Severus of Antioch in 519.

After the Sayfo, became the seat for the Syriac Orthodox Patriarch of Antioch and All the East from 1933 to 1959, hosted manuscripts.

The Syrian Civil War, which began in 2011, had a devastating impact on the city and its Christian population. Many Syriac Orthodox Christians were forced to flee their homes, and the diocese suffered significant losses.

== List of bishops ==
Mor Athanasius (≈ 1000 )

Mor Dionysius Dawud (1175-1177)

Ignatius Noah of Lebanon (1480-1490)

Mor Cyril Jirjis Fattal (1727-1756) seat at the Monastery of St. Elian.

Mor Julius Boutros (1846-1872) as Metropolitan of Syria.

Mor Gregorios Abdullah Sattuf (1880-1886) as Metropolitan of Syria.

Mor Abded Mshiho (1886-1895) as Metropolitan of Syria.

Mor Gregorios Ephrem (1909- ? )

Mor Dionysius AbdulNour (1913- 1917) as Metropolitan of Syria.

Mor Ephrem Barsoum (1918-1957) as Metropolitan of Syria.
Mor Meletios Barnaba (1957- 1997)
Mor Selwanos Boutros Al-Nehmeh (1999-2020)
Mor Timotheos Matta Al-Khoury (2021- currently)

== Territory ==
Mainly the cities of Homs and Hama (recently Tartous) with the villages around, Zaidal, Fairouzeh, Sadad, Al-Hafar, Maskanah, Al-Qaryatayn and Fhaylah.

== Figures ==
| Year | Faithful | Bishop | Priest | Church |
|---|---|---|---|---|
| 1998 | 40 000 | 1 | 13 | 17 |
| 2024 | ? | 1 | 12 | 22 |

== See also ==
- Syriac Orthodox dioceses
