= Saint Mary Church of the Holy Belt =

Cathedral in Homs, Syria

Saint Mary of the Holy Belt Cathedral
- كاتدرائية السيدة العذراء أم الزنار
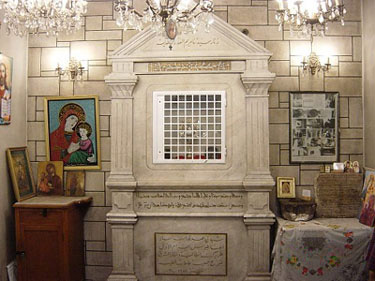
- Saint Mary of the Holy Belt Cathedral
- 34°43′45″N 36°43′12″E
- Address: Homs
- Country: Syria
- Denomination: Syriac Orthodox

History
- Status: Cathedral

Architecture
- Architectural type: Church
- Completed: 59 AD (first structure); 1852 (current structure)

Administration
- Archdiocese: Homs and Hama

Saint Mary of the Holy Belt (Um Al Zennar) Cathedral (Arabic: كاتدرائية السيدة العذراء أم الزنار, shortened to كنيسة أم الزنار; Um az-Zinnar) is a Syriac Orthodox cathedral in Homs, Syria. The first structure on the site was completed in 59 AD, and the present structure dates from 1852. It is the seat of the Syriac Orthodox Archbishop of Homs and Hama.

== History ==
This is one of the prominent church of the Universal Syriac Orthodox Church which is also a Marian Pilgrim Centre. The present structure dates from 1852 under Bishop Julius Peter. But the site over which the church is built is claimed to have been one of Christian worship since 59 AD. The church once served as the headquarters of the universal church. According to Ross Burns, the church may rest on Byzantine foundations. According to Joseph Nasrallah, the existence of a church dedicated to Mary in Homs is attested as early as 478.

The church contains a venerated Holy Girdle that is supposed to be a section of the belt of Mary, mother of Jesus. The church was damaged during confrontations between the armed opposition and the security forces in the 2011–2012 Syrian unrest.

In 2012, reportedly confrontations caused extensive damage to the exterior of the church. The church was restored by an extensive effort of the faithful and the Divine Liturgy was celebrated in 2014.

This is the Syriac church's equivalent of the Cincture of the Theotokos of the Greek Orthodox Church and Girdle of Thomas of the Catholic Church.

== See also ==
- Holy Girdle
- Syriac Orthodox Church
- Syriac Orthodox Christians
