= Eskikale, Artuklu =

Village in Mardin Province, Turkey

Eskikale
- Neighbourhood
- Location in Turkey
- Coordinates: 37.306°N 40.774°E
- Country: Turkey
- Province: Mardin
- District: Artuklu
- Population (2021): 141
- Time zone: UTC+3 (TRT)

Eskikale (Arabic: قلعة الامراة; Kurdish: Kilitmara; Syriac: ܩܠܥܐ ܕܐܢܬܬܐ, romanized: Qalʿat al-Imraʾa) (Note: Also known as Ḥesnō d-Atṯō, Hesno d’Athto, Hesno d-Anttho, Kalaat-Mara, Kalaat-Marah, Kalet-Mara, Kalitmara, Kalitmera, Kaletülmara, Qalʿa d’Antta, Qal’at al-Mar’a, Qal’at al-Imra’a, Qal’at-Mara, Qal‘at Mara, Qalaat Mara, Qalaat Marah, Qalʿatmara, Qal’atmara, Qalʿat al-Emrāʾah, Qal‛ā d Aţţō, or Qalho d'atho. As per Gaunt, the name of the village translates to "the Fortress of the Women" whereas Dinno states that Qalʿatmara is abbreviated from Qalʿat al-Umaraʾ ("the Fortress of the Amirs"). "Qalaat" translates to "fortress" in Arabic.) is a neighbourhood in the municipality and district of Artuklu, Mardin Province in Turkey. The village is populated by Kurds and had a population of 141 in 2021.

== History ==
Qalʿat al-Imraʾa (today called Eskikale) was historically inhabited by Arabic-speaking Syriac Orthodox Christians, Syriac Catholics, and Syriac Protestants. The village was established on the site of an important Roman fortress from which it derived its name. Saint Hananya (c. 739–816), metropolitan of Mardin and Kafartut, rebuilt the village of Qalʿat al-Imraʾa and endowed it to the Mar Shlemun (Solomon) Monastery (later called the Mor Hananyo Monastery). At this time, the village contained 1000 homes and 3 churches. According to the Chronography of Barhebraeus, the citadel at Qalʿat al-Imraʾa was destroyed by Husam al-Din Timurtash (r. 1123–1150), Artuqid emir of Mardin, so to prevent it from being captured by Imad al-Din Zengi, emir of Mosul.

The priest and noted astrologist David Bar Qashafo or Dawud Qashafo of Qalʿat al-Imraʾa (d. 1485) educated Patriarch Ignatius John XIV (r. 1484–1493). Maphrian Basilius Ibrahim II (r. 1496–1507) was from Qalʿat al-Imraʾa. Patriarch Ignatius Abdullah I (r. 1521–1557) was born at Qalʿat al-Imraʾa probably at the end of the fifteenth century. In the 16th century, the village was inhabited by approximately 900 Syriac families, roughly 6300 people. The monk-priest Elijah John Pack of Qalʿat al-Imraʾa (fl. 1547 – c. 1560) and the monk-priest Rizq Allah Ibn Abraham of Qalʿat al-Imraʾa (fl. 1595) were notable calligraphers. 17 deacons and 2 priests were ordained for the Church of Morī Gewargīs at Qalʿat al-Imraʾa in 1575–1591. Timothy Yeshu’, metropolitan of the Patriarchal Office in 1597–1629, was from Qalʿat al-Imraʾa.

Eustathius ‘Abd al-Ahad, metropolitan of Bedlis in 1775–1800, was also from Qalʿat al-Imraʾa. Patriarch Ignatius Jacob II (r. 1847–1871) was born at Qalʿat al-Imraʾa. In the Syriac Orthodox patriarchal register of dues of 1870, it was recorded that the village had 81 households, who paid 228 dues, and was served by the Church of Morī Ğīrğīs and 2 priests. Patriarch Ignatius Abdulmasih II (r. 1895–1905) was born at Qalʿat al-Imraʾa in 1854. The Church of Mar Jirjis (George) at Qalʿat al-Imraʾa was renovated in 1885.

In 1895, upon learning of the massacres of Christians in the Diyarbekir vilayet, some villagers went to the Mor Hananyo Monastery and melted the lead printing forms at the monastery printing house into shells which were then used to defend the village against Kurdish attacks for 5 days, losing 4 men. However, a sniper unit surrounded the village from all sides and killed 70 people in a week. Some villagers fled to the Mor Hananyo Monastery. Government troops sent to defend the village arrived on 11 November 1895. After the massacres in 1895, the village's population was 1500, including 1320 Syriac Orthodox Christians with 3 priests, 2 churches, and a school, and 100 Syriac Catholics with a priest, a church, a school, and 80 Protestants. The Protestants in the village had their own chapel.

It was located in Mardin merkez kaza (central district) in the Mardin sanjak in the Diyarbekir vilayet in c. 1900. By the 20th century, the Church of Mar Shmuni, located to the south west of the village, and the Church of Mar Iyawannis, located to the east of the village, were both in ruins. The village was populated by 800 Syriacs in 1914, according to the list presented to the Paris Peace Conference by the Assyro-Chaldean delegation. The village was principally engaged in wine production and weaving.

On 11 June 1915, women from Qalʿat al-Imraʾa travelled to Mardin and informed Bishop Kirill Givargis of the threats of attacks by Kurds; he advised the villagers to evacuate and seek refuge at the Mor Hananyo Monastery immediately. The Kurdish chieftains Smail Ali Mahmud and Ahmad Mirzo unsuccessfully attempted to convince the villagers to remain at Qalʿat al-Imraʾa, but it was promptly evacuated as the villagers left most of their belongings behind. On 13 June, 54 villagers returned to Qalʿat al-Imraʾa to collect some of their belongings accompanied by 2 Ottoman soldiers. The Ottoman soldiers signaled to the Dashi Kurds who had occupied the village and ambushed the villagers upon their return, killing all but two of the villagers of whom one died of his wounds afterwards on the way to Mardin. The bodies of those who had been ambushed at Qalʿat al-Imraʾa were recovered by the villagers despite coming under fire from the Kurds and buried in a mass grave alongside the Mor Hananyo Monastery. 64 men from the village who had ventured out to Qalʿat al-Imraʾa to pick grapes were attacked by Kurds whilst in the vineyards and 6 were killed.

On 24 June 1915, Nuri Badlisi, the chief of the Al-Khamsin death squad in Mardin, with 50 armed men, arrived at the Mor Hananyo Monastery, arrested 450 men, and took them to Mardin ostensibly to be forced to build roads; 5 or 15 Armenian refugees from Pirane/Payran were shot a crossroads called Khajo south of Mardin and their bodies were left in a cave. The Syriacs who arrived at Mardin managed to bribe the guards, individually or in groups, and fled back to the Mor Hananyo Monastery where they were made to continue to pay bribes monthly for their own safety. Hunger and poor hygiene led to the death of many of the refugees at the Mor Hananyo Monastery; some of those who left the monastery in search of help were taken in by Arab Bedouins, whilst some found shelter amongst the Yazidis in the Sinjar Mountains, and others died alone in the wasteland or in the mountains. By the end of the First World War, Qalʿat al-Imraʾa had been almost completely destroyed and there were only 15 homes left in the village.

The final Syriac family left Qalʿat al-Imraʾa in 1994 after the only young girl in the village was kidnapped by a Kurd and the parents were unable to retrieve her.

== Bibliography ==
- Abed Mshiho Neman of Qarabash (2021) [1918]. Sayfo – An Account of the Assyrian Genocide. Translated by Michael Abdalla; Łukasz Kiczko. Edinburgh University Press.
- Barsoum, Aphrem (2003). The Scattered Pearls: A History of Syriac Literature and Sciences. Translated by Matti Moosa (2nd ed.). Gorgias Press.
- Barsoum, Aphrem (2008). History of the Za'faran Monastery. Translated by Matti Moosa. Gorgias Press.
- Bcheiry, Iskandar (2009). The Syriac Orthodox Patriarchal Register of Dues of 1870: An Unpublished Historical Document from the Late Ottoman Period. Gorgias Press.
- Bcheiry, Iskandar (2010). A List of Syriac Orthodox Ecclesiastic Ordinations from the Sixteenth and Seventeenth Century: The Syriac Manuscript of Hunt 444 (Syr 68 in Bodleian Library, Oxford). Gorgias Press.
- Biner, Zerrin Özlem (2020). States of Dispossession: Violence and Precarious Coexistence in Southeast Turkey. University of Pennsylvania Press.
- Courtois, Sébastien de (2004). The Forgotten Genocide: Eastern Christians, The Last Arameans. Translated by Vincent Aurora. Gorgias Press.
- Dinno, Khalid S. (2017). The Syrian Orthodox Christians in the Late Ottoman Period and Beyond: Crisis then Revival. Gorgias Press.
- Gaunt, David (2006). Massacres, Resistance, Protectors: Muslim-Christian Relations in Eastern Anatolia during World War I. Gorgias Press.
- Jongerden, Joost; Verheij, Jelle, eds. (2012). Social Relations in Ottoman Diyarbekir, 1870-1915. Brill.
- Kiraz, George A. (2011). "ʿAbdullāh I bar Sṭephanos". In Sebastian P. Brock; Aaron M. Butts; George A. Kiraz; Lucas Van Rompay (eds.). Gorgias Encyclopedic Dictionary of the Syriac Heritage. Piscataway, NJ: Gorgias Press. p. 4.
- Wilmshurst, David (2016). Bar Hebraeus The Ecclesiastical Chronicle: An English Translation. Gorgias Press.
- Yacoub, Joseph (2016). Year of the Sword: The Assyrian Christian Genocide, A History. Translated by James Ferguson. Oxford University Press.
