= Ignatius Elias II =

114th Patriarch of the Syriac Orthodox Church of Antioch (1838-1847)

- Syriac Orthodox Patriarch of Antioch and All the East
- Church: Syriac Orthodox Church
- See: Antioch
- Installed: 1838
- Term ended: 1847
- Predecessor: Ignatius George V
- Successor: Ignatius Jacob II

Personal details
- Born: Elias; 1778 Mosul, Ottoman Empire
- Died: 1847 (aged 68–69) Mor Hananyo
- Residence: Mor Hananyo

Ignatius Elias II (1778–1847) was the Patriarch of Antioch and head of the Syriac Orthodox Church from 1838 until his death in 1847.

== Biography ==
Elias was born at Mosul about 1778 and was the son of Hindi Karmeh. When he reached his youth, he joined Mor Mattai Monastery near Mosul. He was ordained monk by Metropolitan Eustathios Moosa in 1791 and in 1798 he was appointed the abbot of Mar Behnam Monastery that used to belong to the Syriac Orthodox Church at that time. In 1811 he was ordained as ecumenical metropolitan by Ignatius Matthew and was given the name Gregorius. Then in 1817, he was appointed as Metropolitan of Mosul and Maphrian of the East by Ignatius Yunan and assumed the name Basil Elias III. In 1819, as a Maphrian of the East, he put his hand on the patriarch Ignatius George V at his consecration as the new Patriarch of Syriac Orthodox Church.

== Patriarchal consecration ==
In 1836, after the death of Ignatius George V, Gregorius Elias was elected a Patriarch and was given the name Ignatius Elias II. However, the Holy Synod didn't agree to consecrate him until he gets the necessary approvals from the Ottoman government so he had to travel to Istanbul where he spent about 14 months until he got all the approval in addition to approvals to take back some churches and buildings from the Syriac Catholic Church. He came back to Mor Hananyo and was consecrated in October, 1838.

== Episcopal succession ==
During Ignatius Elias II time as Patriarch and Metropolitan, he had the duty to ordain and consecrate many Metropolitans in the Syria Orthodox church in addition to tens of priests, monks, and deacons.

1. Cyril Matthew (1838-1846). Metropolitan of the Patriarchal Office. Later, he was appointed Metropolitan of Mor Mattai Monastery (1846-1858)
2. Gregorios Behnam (1838-1852). Metropolitan of Mosul. Later, he was elected Basil Behnam Maphrian of the East (1852-1859)
3. Eustathios AbdulNour of Al-Ruha (1840-1877). Metropolitan of Jerusalem
4. Cyril George (1842-1847). Bishop of Azekh
5. Gregprios Behnam (1845-1846). Metropolitan of Mor Hananyo
6. Athanasius Barsoum (1845-1873). Metropolitan of the Monastery of Beth El
7. Cyril Yuyakkim (1845)
8. Julius Boutros (1846). Metropolitan of Syria. Later, in 1872, he was elected Ignatius Peter IV, the 116th Patriarch of the Syriac Orthodox Church

Preceded by Basil Elias III Karmeh	Syriac Orthodox Maphrian of the East; 1817-1838	Succeeded by Basil Behnam IV
Preceded by Ignatius George V	Syriac Orthodox Patriarch of Antioch; 1838-1847	Succeeded by Ignatius Jacob II
