= Saint Hananya =

Syriac Orthodox saint, bishop of Mardin, and namesake of a monastery (d. 618)

Mar Hananya (Ananias)
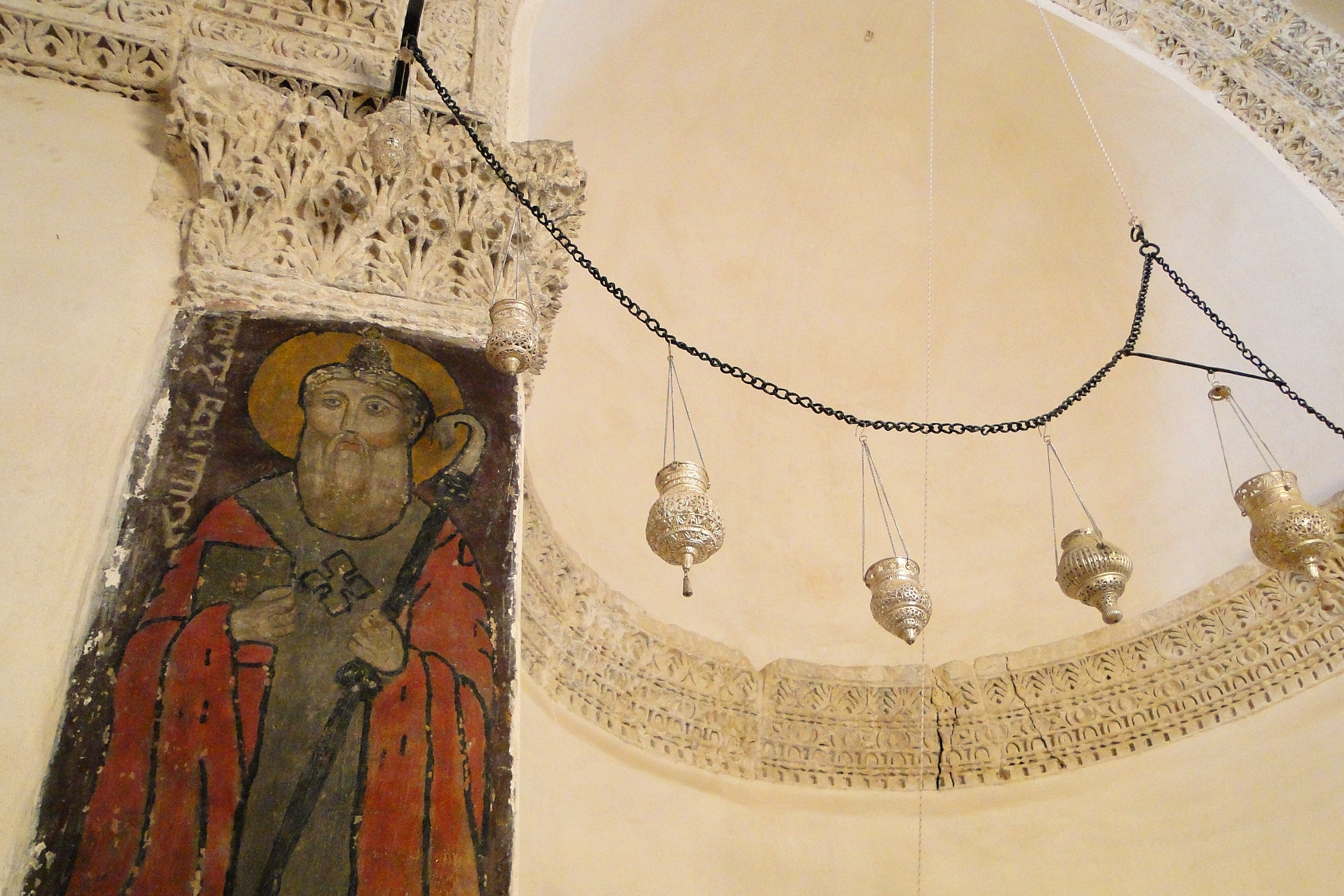
- A portrait of Saint Ananias at the monastery of Mor Hananyo

Saint
- Born: ܚܢܢܝܐ / Ḥananyā c. 739‌ AD
- Died: 816 AD; Mor Hananyo Monastery
- Resting place: Mor Hananyo Monastery; 37°17′58″N 40°47′33″E
- Honored in: Oriental Orthodox Church, especially Syriac Orthodox Church
- Major shrine: Mor Hananyo Monastery
- Feast: 12 July and Whitsunday
- Tradition or genre: Syriac Christianity

Saint Hananya, also called Mar Hananya or Mor Hananyo (Syriac: ܡܪܝ ܚܢܢܝܐ) also known as Ananias of Mardin, was the 8th-century Syriac Orthodox metropolitan bishop of Mardin and Kafartut. He is mainly remembered for restoring and expanding the monastery that would later bear his name to this day, Mor Hananyo Monastery (also called Deyrulzafaran) in Mardin, southeastern Turkey. His leadership transformed the site into one of the most important intellectual and spiritual centres of the Syriac Orthodox Church, establishing its role as a patriarchal seat for nearly 8 centuries.

== Life ==
Little is known of Hananya's early life or family background. He received his early education and was ordained monk at the Monastery of Mor Mattai near Mosul, according to Bar Hebraeus and later biographers. Other sources, such as Michael the Syrian, record that he may have instead been educated at the Knushia Monastery near Callinicus (Raqqa), before his ordination as metropolitan of Mardin and Kafartut.

In 793, he was consecrated by Patriarch Quryaqos (793–817) as the 6th metropolitan bishop ordained during his patriarchate. At the time of his consecration, the Monastery of Mor Shlemun (Solomon) near Mardin — later renamed the Mor Hananyo Monastery after Hananya — lay in disrepair having been partly ruined since the early 7th century. Hananya purchased the site from the local rulers with a large sum of gold and undertook extensive restoration.

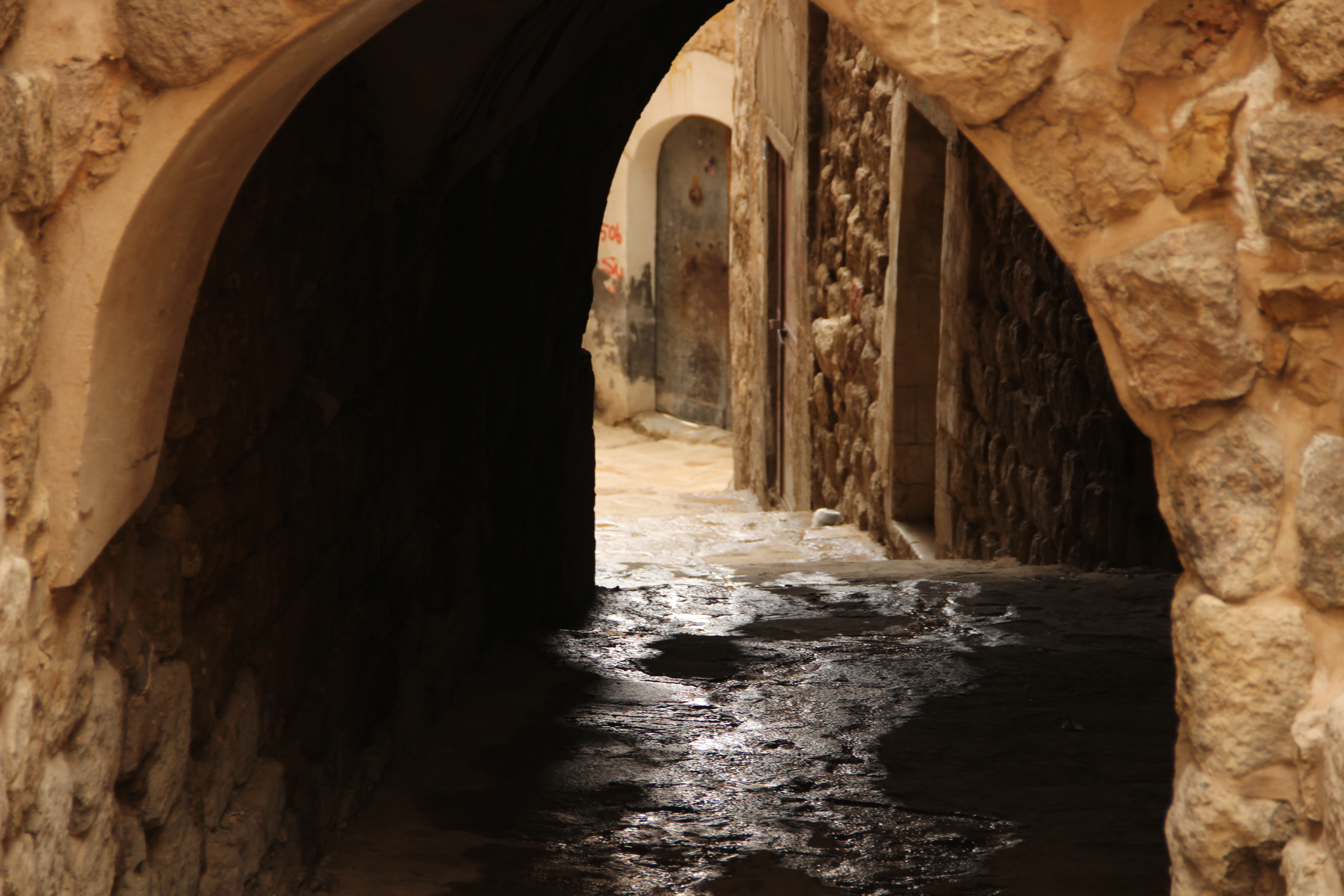
Mardin old town

Hananya rebuilt the monastery's church, later known as the Church of Mor Hananyo or Domed Church, with great attention to detail. The structure survives largely intact despite its age. Within it, several patriarchs, beginning with Michael the Great in 1166, were enthroned. A large painted portrait of Mar Hananya himself, inscribed in Estrangelo script with "The Saint Mar Hananya", is still preserved in the southern part of the building.

As bishop, he expanded the monastery's library, enriching it with numerous manuscripts, and planted surrounding lands with vineyards, olive groves, and other trees, creating a sustainable monastic economy. He enacted rules for communal life and attracted 80 monks to the community, which became a vibrant centre of Syriac Orthodox spirituality and learning. He also rebuilt the nearby village of Qal'at al-Imra'a (Qal'atmara), which contained a thousand houses and three churches, and designated it as an endowment for the monastery.

Hananya was widely known for his piety, wisdom, and generosity. Though personally wealthy, he is remembered for exhausting his fortune on acts of charity, especially in support of the poor and marginalised. Over his 40 years as metropolitan, he ordained nearly 700 priests and deacons across his diocese, which included Mardin, Dara, Khabur, Kafartut, and Tellbsam.

After leading the monastery for 23 years, Hananya died at the age of 77. He was buried within the monastery he had restored and expanded, which from that time onward bore his name. He was succeeded by his disciple Ignatius I in 816, who continued to enlarge the monastery and its library.

== Role in the monastery ==
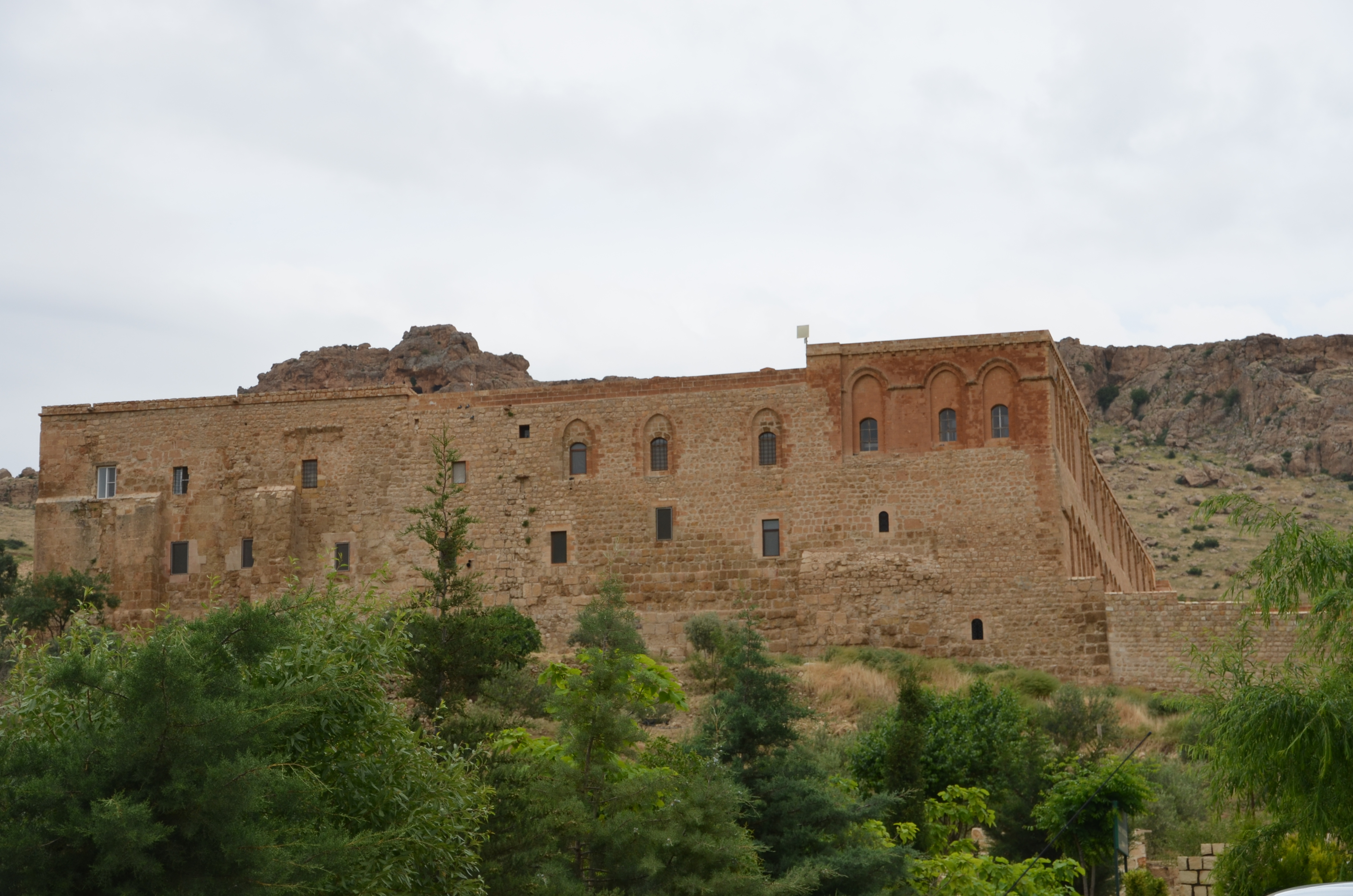
The monastery as it stands today with its yellow-tinged walls.

The site of the future monastery had long been significant as it was originally a temple to the Mesopotamian sun-god Šamaš, and it later became a Roman citadel before its conversion into a Christian monastery in 493 AD. By the time of Hananya's episcopate, the monastery had fallen into ruin.

Mar Hananya undertook a major restoration of the monastery. He strengthened its structures, expanded the facilities for monastic life, and established a grand library that would become one of the most important repositories of Syriac manuscripts in the region. Under his care, the number of monks grew to around 80, and the monastery became a flourishing centre of monasticism.

In addition to architectural restoration, Mar Hananya also transformed the landscape surrounding the monastery. He planted large gardens, olive groves, and vineyards to ensure both the self-sufficiency of the monastic community and the beautification of its grounds. To provide the monastery with sustainable income and security, he rebuilt the nearby village of Qal'at al-Imra'a (colloquially Qalʿatmara) establishing it as an endowment. At its height, the village contained about 1000 houses and 3 churches, serving as a vital support base for the monastery's needs.

It was during his tenure that the monastery acquired its enduring name Dayro d-Mor Hananyo, in recognition of his important role in its revival. It also became known as Deryulzafaran (Saffron Monastery) based on the hypothesis that saffron was mixed into the mortar used to build its walls, giving it a yellow tint.

== Legacy and veneration ==
Mar Hananya is remembered in the Syriac Orthodox Church as a saint and a great renovator of the church's spiritual and cultural life. His name was inscribed in the Book of Life alongside the saints of the Church, and his commemoration is done on 12 July and on Whitsunday. His sanctity is celebrated for his piety, wisdom, and generosity especially his devotion to the poor and his dedication to improving monastic practices.

The monastery itself became a centre of pilgrimage and remembrance, and his portrait bearing the Syriac inscription "The Saint Mar Hananya" remains preserved within the church to this day.

Wider cultural memory of Mar Hananya remains strong. The Syriac Orthodox, especially the faithful in Tur Abdin, continue to venerate him by singing hymns composed in his honor. The diaspora makes pilgrimages to the monastery that bears his name to this day. His relics are interred within the monastery, where he died and was buried in 816.

== See also ==
- Syriac Patriarchate of Antioch
- Mor Gabriel Monastery
- Syriac Christianity
- Gabriel of Beth Qustan
- Syriac literature

== Sources ==
- Ignatius Aphram I Barsoum (2008). History of the Za'faraan Monastery. Publications of the Archdiocese of the Syriac Orthodox Church. Translated by Matti Moosa. Piscataway, NJ: Gorgias Press. ISBN 978-1-59333-639-4.
