= Ignatius Matthew =

111th Patriarch of the Syriac Orthodox Church of Antioch (1782–1817)

- Syriac Orthodox Patriarch of Antioch and All the East
- Church: Syriac Orthodox Church
- See: Antioch
- Installed: 1782
- Term ended: 1817
- Predecessor: Ignatius George IV
- Successor: Ignatius Yunan

Personal details
- Born: Matthew Mardin, Ottoman Empire
- Died: 1817 Mor Hananyo
- Residence: Mor Hananyo

Ignatius Matthew (Matta) was the Patriarch of Antioch and head of the Syriac Orthodox Church from 1782 until his death in 1817.

== Biography ==
Matthew's father was Deacon Yeshu from Mardin. He joined Mor Hananyo and was ordained a priest and became the abbot of the monastery. After Ignatius George IV was consecrated as a patriarch, he ordained in 1770, Matthew as Metropolitan of Mor Mattai Monastery and Mosul and was called Cyril and due to the conflict with the Syriac Catholic group in Mosul, he was exiled from Mosul for some time. When the Patriarch Ignatius George IV died, he was requested to be the new patriarch, but when he arrived in Mardin, he found that Michael Jarwah, the metropolitan of Aleppo was already there and managed to get himself elected as the Syriac Orthodox Church patriarch even though he was part of the Syriac Catholic church. When that happened, Matthew went and stayed in a village called Qeleth in Tur Abdin. There, all the metropolitan in Tur-Abdin met and elected Ignatius Matthew a legitimate patriarch for the Syriac Orthodox Church in opposition to Ignatius Michael III Jarweh. When the firman from the Ottoman government arrived approving his election, he was consecrated as a patriarch. One of the Metropolitan that he ordained in 1806 was called Behnam and he was from the Mosul area. Ignatius Matthew consecrated him as a patriarch when he was still alive against the church tradition but after he knew he doesn’t have a true Orthodox faith, he was interrogated by the Church fathers and therefore Behnam was excommunicated from the church and ordered to leave Mor Hananyo. Shortly before his death in 1817, Ignatius Matthew called Basil Yunan, the Maphrian of the East and consecrated him as patriarch Ignatius Yunan in the attendance of 4 metropolitan.

== Episcopal succession ==
During Ignatius Matthew time as Patriarch, he had the duty to ordain many Metropolitans in the Syria Orthodox church in addition to many priests, monks, and deacons

1. Basil Yunan (1803-1817). Maphrian of the East. Later in 1817, he was elected Ignatius Yunan, the 112 Patriarch of Syriac Orthodox Church (1817-1818).
2. Gregorios George (1803). Metropolitan of Damascus and added Aleppo in 1817. Later in 1819, he was elected Ignatius George V, the 113 Patriarch of Syriac Orthodox Church (1819-1836).
3. Cyril Abdul-Aziz (1782-1793). Metropolitan of Mosul, Mor Mattai Monastery, and Mor Behnam Monastery
4. Severus John Al-Bustani (1783-1825). Bishop
5. Disyuqarius Sa'eed (1783). Metropolitan of Al-Jazirah
6. Cyril Jacob Mirijan (1783-1804). Metropolitan of Midyat
7. Cyril Isreal (1785). Metropolitan for the Monastery of the Cross in Tur-Abdin
8. Eustathius Musa (1790-1828). Metropolitan of the Patriarchal Office and then Metropolitan of Mor Mattai Monastery
9. Basil Bishara (1789-1803). Maphrian of the East
10. Cyril Abdulahad (1791). Metropolitan of St. Mark
11. Cyril Elias (1803). Ecumenical Metropolitan
12. Athanasius Ne’ma (1803). Metropolitan of Monastery for Mother of God in Hattakh area
13. Dionysius Shamoun (1803). Ecumenical Metropolitan
14. Julius Abdulahad (1803). Metropolitan for Monastery of MOR Abhai and Gargar
15. Cyril Frangoul (1805-1814). Bishop of Midyat
16. Athanasius ‘Abd al-Ahad (1806–1816). Ecumenical Metropolitan
17. Behnam (1806). Ecumenical Metropolitan
18. Dioscuros Yuhanna (1806-1823). Metropolitan in India
19. Timothy Yeshu (1809-1820). Bishop of the Monastery of Makhar,
20. Gregorios Elias (1811). Metropolitan for the Patriarchal Office, then in 1817, he was appointed Metropolitan of Mosul
21. Abdullah. Metropolitan of Edessa
22. Iwannis Yalda. Metropolitan of Amid

== Death ==
Ignatius Matthew died in July 1817, 20 days after he consecrated Ignatius Yunan as a patriarch and he was buried in Mor Hananyo.

Preceded by Ignatius George IV	Syriac Orthodox Patriarch of Antioch; 1782-1817	Succeeded by Ignatius Yunan
