= Ignatius Peter IV =

116th Patriarch of Syriac Orthodox Church of Antioch (1872–1894)

- Syriac Orthodox Patriarch of Antioch and All the East
- Church: Syriac Orthodox Church
- See: Antioch
- Installed: 1872
- Term ended: 1894
- Predecessor: Ignatius Jacob II
- Successor: Ignatius Abdul Masih II

Personal details
- Born: Boutros ibn Salmo Mesko; 1798 Mosul, Mosul Vilayet, Ottoman Empire
- Died: 8 October 1894 ( aged 95-96) Mardin, Ottoman Empire
- Residence: Monastery of Mor Hananyo

Mor Ignatius Peter IV (1798 – 8 October 1894), also known as Ignatius Peter III, was the Patriarch of Antioch, and head of the Syriac Orthodox Church from 1872 until his death in 1894. He is regarded by many as the architect of the modern church.

== Early life ==
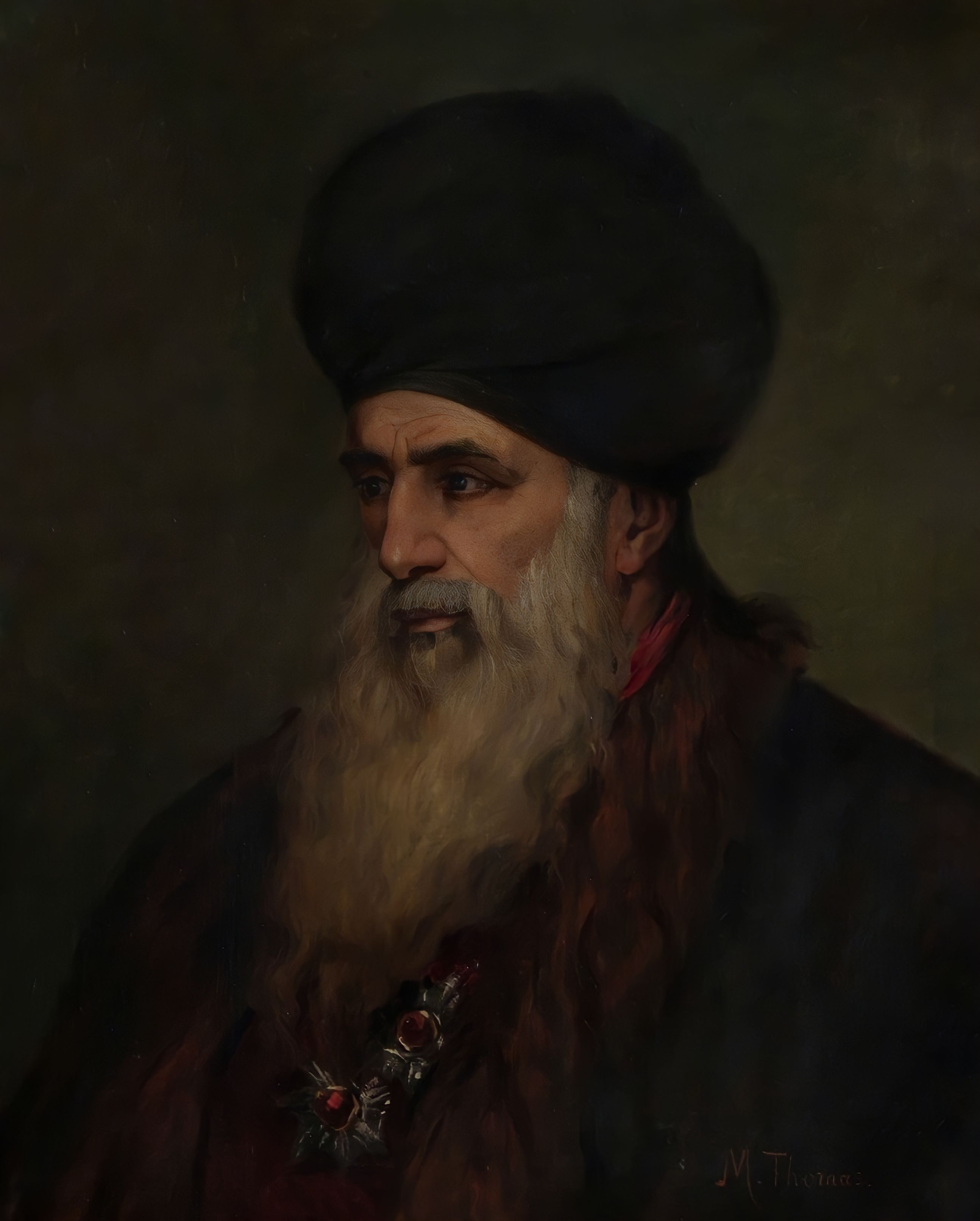
painting of Mor Ignatius Peter IV

Peter was born in the city of Mosul in 1798 into a well known Christian family and spent his childhood at the Monastery of Mor Hananyo, where he would later become a monk and also be ordained as a priest. In 1846, Peter was ordained Metropolitan of Syria by the Patriarch Ignatius Elias II and adopted the name Julius.

== Metropolitan bishop ==
As metropolitan, Peter engaged and succeeded in a dispute with the Syriac Catholic Church over ownership of various ancient churches and monasteries within his diocese and as a result recovered many for the Syriac Orthodox Church.

He renovated Saint Mary Church of the Holy Belt in Homs.

On 2 June 1866, Peter allegedly consecrated the French Presbyterian minister Jules Ferrette as Bishop of Iona, giving him a mission to introduce Oriental Orthodoxy to the West. No original document of this alleged consecration is known to exist; Ferrette published what he claimed was an English translation of his Syriac consecration document after he arrived in London, with the signature of the British consul at Damascus, Syria. He also later allegedly approved the consecration of Joseph Rene Vilatte by Malankara Orthodox Syriac bishops; and he excommunicated Vilatte for ordaining others contrary to Oriental canon law.

At the time of Ignatius Jacob II's death, in 1871, Peter was staying in Constantinople and could not travel to Mardin for the patriarchal election. However, the synod unanimously elected him as patriarch. At first he declined the position, but under continuous persuasion Peter was consecrated as patriarch on 16 June 1872 at the Monastery of Mor Hananyo, upon which he assumed the patriarchal name Ignatius.

== Patriarch ==
Soon after he became patriarch, Peter renovated the Monastery of Mor Hananyo and ordained Rabban Abded Sattuf as Metropolitan of Jerusalem under the name Gregorius. In 1873, he moved to Constantinople where he was recognised by the Ottoman government as the official Syriac Orthodox patriarch and received the appropriate rights.

== Episcopal succession ==
1. Gregorios Abded Aloho (1872–1880). Metropolitan of Jerusalem. Later, he was elected Ignatius Abded Aloho II the 118th Patriarch of Syriac Orthodox Church of Antioch
2. Cyril Elias (1872–1921). Metropolitan of Mor Mattai Monastery
3. Julius Behnam of Akra (1872). Metropolitan of Al-Jazeera
4. Antimous Ya'koub (1873–1915). Bishop of Karburan. He was martyred in 1915 during the Sayfo
5. Athanasius Paulose (1876-1907). Metropolitan of Kottayam
6. Julios Geevarghese (1876-1884). Metropolitan of Thumpamon
7. Gregorios Geevarghese (1876-1902). Metropolitan of Niranam
8. Coorilos Geevarghese (1876-1891). Metropolitan of Angamaly
9. Ivanios Paulose (1877-1913). Metropolitan of Kandanad
10. Dionysius Simon (1877-1886). Metropolitan of Kochi
11. Cyril Youhana (1881-1901). Metropolitan of Nisibis and its dependencies.
12. Athanasius Denho (1882–1815). Metropolitan of Siverek. He was martyred in 1915 during the Sayfo
13. Timothy Paulus (1883–1914). Bishop of Urfa (Edessa) and then a Patriarchal Vicar in Istanbul
14. Iyawannis Elias (1886–1930). Ecumenical Metropolitan then Metropolitan of Syria, then Metropolitan of Jerusalem
15. Timothy Ephrem. Bishop of the Monastery of Mor Gabriel
16. Timothy Jibrayel. Bishop of the Monastery of Mor Qūryāqūs

== Death ==
Patriarch Ignatius Peter IV died on 8 October 1894 whilst at Mardin and was buried at Beth Qadishe at Mor Hananyo.

Preceded by Ignatius Jacob II	Syriac Orthodox Patriarch of Antioch; 1872–1894	Succeeded by Ignatius Abdul Masih II
