= Ignatius Yunan =

112th Patriarch of the Syriac Orthodox Church of Antioch (1817-1818)

- Syriac Orthodox Patriarch of Antioch and All the East
- Church: Syriac Orthodox Church
- See: Antioch
- Installed: 1817
- Term ended: 1818
- Predecessor: Ignatius Matthew
- Successor: Ignatius George V

Personal details
- Born: Mosul, Ottoman Empire
- Died: 1823 Monastery of MOR Elias, Tur-Abdin
- Residence: Mor Hananyo

Ignatius Yunan was the Patriarch of Antioch and head of the Syriac Orthodox Church from 1817 until 1818 when he resigned from the Holy See and went to live in the Monastery of Mor Elias until his death in 1823. His time as a patriarch was the shortest among all Syriac Orthodox patriarchs. Patriarch Ignatius Matthew selected him to the office of Maphrian of the East in 1803 but at the beginning of 1817, he invited him to be his successor in contradiction to the tradition of the church and that is why he is considered by some as illegitimate patriarch until Ignatius Matthew died and then he was duly elected as a patriarch. He was known of his piety and continues fasting but that didn’t help him in managing the affairs of the Patriarchate and alienated some faithful in the city of Mardin. When he saw that, he decided to abdicate the See of Antioch and went to live in the Monastery of MOR Elias in Tur-Abdin until he died in 1823.

== Episcopal succession ==
There is no information if Ignatius Yunan ordained any Metropolitan in his short time as a patriarch. However, one of the future patriarchs Ignatius Jacob II studied under him after he went to live in the Monastery of MOR Elias in Tur-Abdin.

Preceded by Basil Elias III	Syriac Orthodox Maphrian of the East; 1803-1817	Succeeded by Basil Bishara
Preceded by Ignatius Matthew	Syriac Orthodox Patriarch of Antioch; 1817-1818	Succeeded by Ignatius George V
