= Ignatius Jacob II =

115th Patriarch of the Syriac Orthodox Church of Antioch (1847–1871)

- Syriac Orthodox Patriarch of Antioch and All the East
- Church: Syriac Orthodox Church
- See: Antioch
- Installed: 1847
- Term ended: 1871
- Predecessor: Ignatius Elias II
- Successor: Ignatius Peter IV

Personal details
- Born: Jacob (Yacuob); 1800 Qa’at Mara, Ottoman Empire
- Died: 1871 (aged 70–71) Diyarbakır
- Residence: Mor Hananyo

Ignatius Jacob II was the Patriarch of Antioch and head of the Syriac Orthodox Church from 1847 until his death in 1871.

== Biography ==
Jacob was born at the village of Qal'at Mara east of Mor Hananyo in 1800. He was the son of Yousif Kapso and when he reached adulthood, he left his village to Tur Abdin and started to study under Ignatius Yunan at the Monastery of MOR Elias near a village called Hbob. He became a monk in 1818 and in 1819 he was elevated to the rank of Monk-Priest. In 1831, Patriarch Ignatius George V ordained him as ecumenical metropolitan as Cyril and appointed him as metropolitan of Mor Hananyo and Mardin. After his ordination, he traveled to Tbilisi that was part of Russian Empire at that time and contacted the Nicholas I of Russia looking for help in taking back the churches and monasteries that were takien over by the schismic part of the church. In 1844, he was appointed Patriarchal Vicar in the city of Istanbul where he bought a house and converted it to a church after obtaining the necessary permits and called this church St. Mary. While he was in Istanbul, he bought a small printing press with Syriac fonts and published two books. The first was a prayer book in Garshuni and the second was the book of Psalms in Syriac. After he finished printing the two books, he headed back to Mardin and Mor Hananyo to distribute these two books and visit his family and to collect funds to pay the debts that Patriarch Ignatius Elias II incurred during his legal pursues to claim back the Syriac Orthodox churches in Mosul.

== Patriarchal consecration ==
Upon arriving to Diyarbakir, Cyril Jacob heard that the Patriarch Ignatius Elias II died. so he continued his was to Mor Hananyo and Mardin. In the monastery a synod was held and all the Metropolitans who participated in the Synod voted to elect Cyril Jacob as the new Patriarch for the Syriac Orthodox Church. When the two Metropolitans from Mosul and Mor Mattai Monastery arrived after the election, they both approved the election of Cyril Jacob. He was consecrated as a Patriarch shortly after. One of the other decisions of the Synod is appointing Metropolitan Julius Peter as metropolitan of Damascus who later was elected as a new Patriarch after Jacob II death and assumed the name Ignatius Peter IV In 1852 he selected Basil Behnam IV to be the new Syriac Orthodox Church Mapherian of the East and he stayed until he died in 1859. After Basil Behnam IV death, the Mapherianate office was abolished

== Episcopal succession ==
During Ignatius Jacob II time as Patriarch and Metropolitan, he had the duty to ordain and consecrate one Maphrian and many Metropolitans in the Syria Orthodox church in addition to tens of priests, monks, and deacons.

1. Basil Behnam IV (1852-1859). Maphrian of the East
2. Dionysius Joseph II (1865-1909). Malankara Metropolitan
3. Iwanis Elias (1847-1854). Bishop of Istanbul
4. Philoxinous Zaytoun of Anhil (1848-1855). Metropolitan of Midyat
5. Cyril Denha (1858-1871). Bishop of Monastery of St. Matthew
6. Julius Abdulnasih (1858). Metropolitan of Amid
7. Abdulmassih (1860). Metropolitan of Diyarbakir
8. Disyonius Behnam (1860). Metropolitan of Ma'adan
9. Cyril George (1860-1917). Ecumenical Metropolitan (1862-1864), then Metropolitan of Mosul (1864-1866), al-Bushairiyya, Diyarbakr, and al-Ruha (Edessa).
10. Disyonius Behnam (1864–1911). Metropolitan of Mosul

== Death ==
Ignatius Jacob II died in February 12, 1871 after what looked like a stroke and he was buried near the South alter at the St. Mary Church, Diyarbakır.

Preceded by Ignatius Elias II	Syriac Orthodox Patriarch of Antioch; 1847–1871	Succeeded by Ignatius Peter IV
