= Ignatius George V =

113th Patriarch of the Syriac Orthodox Church of Antioch (1819-1836)

- Syriac Orthodox Patriarch of Antioch and All the East
- Church: Syriac Orthodox Church
- See: Antioch
- Installed: 1819
- Term ended: 1836
- Predecessor: Ignatius Yunan
- Successor: Ignatius Elias II

Personal details
- Born: George Aleppo, Ottoman Empire
- Died: 1836 Mor Hananyo
- Residence: Mor Hananyo

Ignatius George V was the Patriarch of Antioch and head of the Syriac Orthodox Church from 1818 until his death in 1836.

== Biography ==
George was born at Aleppo in the 18th century and was the son of Makdasi Yousef Sayar Al-Halabi. We don't have much information about his early life except that he joined Mor Hananyo and was ordained a Metropolitan of Damascus by Ignatius Matthew and was given the name Gregorius. He was in attendance when Ignatius Yunan which was declared illegal since Ignatius Matthew didn't have the right to elect and consecrate his successor After Ignatius Yunan showed weakness in his admiration of the Patriarchate, the people of Mardin asked George to come back to their city and he did when he observed the mismanagement, he traveled to Istanbul and requested that he be appointed as Syriac Orthodox Patriarch. After his request was approved, he travelled to city of Amid and on the way he heard that the Patriarch Ignatius Yunan had left the monastery and went to live in the Monastery of MOR Elias in Tur-Abdin. In March 1819, he travelled to Mor Hananyo and was officially consecrated as a Patriarch for the Syriac Orthodox Church by the metropolitans who gathered at the monastery. In the same year he was imprisoned by the governor of Mardin for 4 days and he was released after paying a hefty bribe. However, after he was released he submitted a complaints to the Ottoman government about what happened to him. The Ottoman government sent a decree to the governor of Marine to pay back the bribe and that what happened. In 1824, he sent Metropolitan Athanasius Abdulassih to visit the Syriac Orthodox Church in India along with two monks, Issac and Abdulahad. When they arrived, they visited the churches and helped in strengthing the faithful true believes.

== Episcopal succession ==
As patriarch, George ordained the following bishops

1. Cyril Jacob (1831). Metropolitan of Mardin and the aboot of Mor Hananyo. Later in 1847, he was elected the Patriarch Ignatius Jacob II the 115 Patriarch of the Syriac Orthodox Church
2. Cyril Garbriel (1820). Metropolitan of Bilitis
3. Athanasius Abdulmassih (1820). Ecumenical Metropolitan
4. Jacob Al-Rishani (1825). Metropolitan of St. Behnam in Damascus
5. Athanasius Joseph (1825). Metropolitan of Mardin
6. Dionysus Gabriel (1825). Metropolitan of Monastery of MOR Kyriakos in Bisheri
7. Gregorios (1826). Metropolitan of St. Mark Monastery in Jerusalem
8. Julius Anthony (1826). Ecumenical Metropolitan
9. Timothy Ibraheem (1826). Metropolitan of Mardin
10. Cyril Matthew Rassam (1833). Metropolitan of the Patriarchal Office
11. Cyril Malke of Anhil (1834-1864). Bishop of Midyat
12. George (1836). Metropolitan of Jerusalem

== Death ==
Ignatius George V died in 1836 and was buried in Beth Qadish (House of Saints) in Mor Hananyo

Preceded by Ignatius Yunan	Syriac Orthodox Patriarch of Antioch; 1818-1836	Succeeded by Ignatius Elias II
