= Koçlu, Kızıltepe =

Village in Mardin Province, Turkey

Koçlu
- Neighbourhood
- Location in Turkey
- Coordinates: 37.122°N 40.509°E
- Country: Turkey
- Province: Mardin
- District: Kızıltepe
- Population (2021): 91
- Time zone: UTC+3 (TRT)

Koçlu (Kurdish: Kefertût) is a neighbourhood in the municipality and district of Kızıltepe, Mardin Province in Turkey. The village is predominantly populated by Kurds of the Xalecan tribe and had a population of 91 in 2021.

Besides Kurds of the Xalecan tribe, the village is also home to Kurds from the Erbanî and Omerkan tribes and has moreover Arab residents. It is formerly populated by Assyrians.
