= Mor Hananyo Monastery =

Syriac Orthodox facility in Turkey

- ܕܝܪܐ ܕܡܪܝ ܚܢܢܝܐ
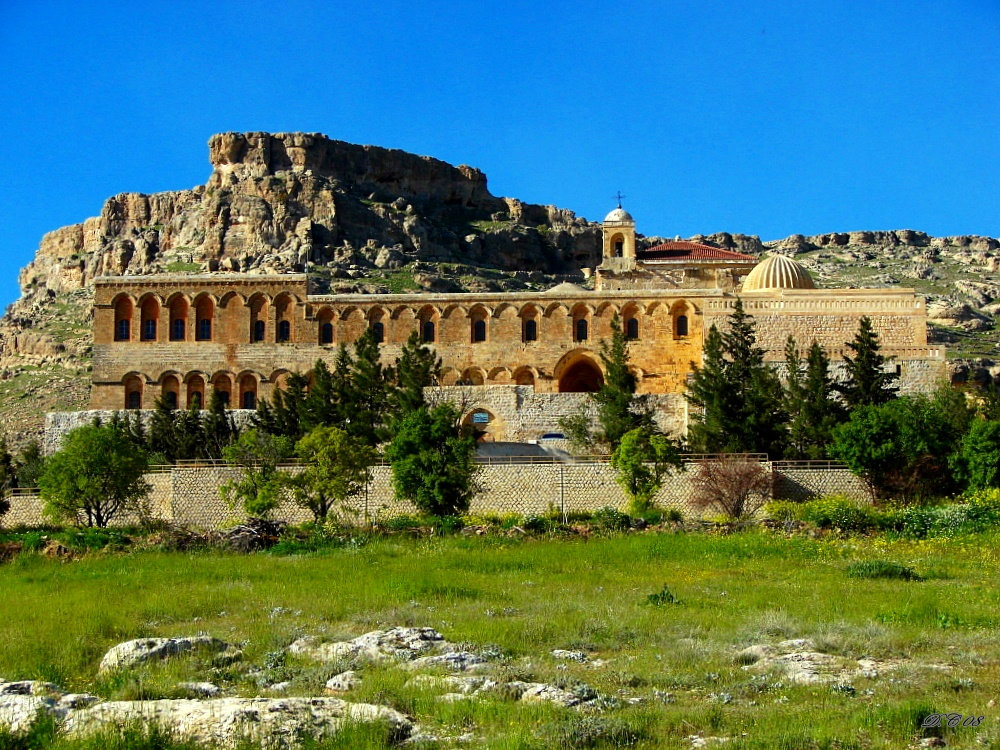
- The walls of the monastery have a yellowish hue attributed to saffron mixed into the lime mortar

- Location within Turkey Location within Near East

Monastery information
- Other name: Dayro d-Mor Hananyo
- Denomination: Syriac Orthodox
- Established: 493
- Dedication: Saint Hananya
- Diocese: Archdiocese of Mardin
- Controlled churches: Virgin Mary Church, Dome Church, Beth Qadisheh, Church of the Patriarchal Throne

People
- Founder: Mor Shelmon
- Abbot: Mor Philoxenos Saliba Özmen

Architecture
- Status: Active

Site
- Location: Near Mardin, Turkey
- Coordinates: 37°17′58″N 40°47′33″E

The Mor Hananyo (Note: "Hananyo" is the West-Syriac pronunciation and appears on the monastery's entrance. In Classical Syriac it is pronounced "Hananya" and found transliterated as such in some literature.) Monastery (Syriac: ܕܝܪܐ ܕܡܪܝ ܚܢܢܝܐ, romanised: Dayro d-Mor Hananyo), also called Monastery of Saint Ananias, Deyrulzafaran (Arabic: ديرالزعفران, romanised: Dayr al-Za'farān) or Dayro d-Kurkmo (Syriac: ܕܝܪܐ ܕܟܘܪܟܡܐ), and in Turkish, Deyrulzafaran Manastırı, commonly known in English as the Saffron Monastery, is one of the most renowned monasteries of the Syriac Orthodox Church. Located about 3 km (1.9 mi) east of Mardin, Turkey, in the Syriac cultural region Tur Abdin, it has served as a spiritual, cultural, and intellectual centre of Syriac Orthodox Christianity for centuries. From 1166 to 1932, it functioned as the Patriarchal See of Antioch, housing 53 patriarchs and metropolitans in its burial chambers.

Beginning as a temple to the Assyrian sun‑god Šamaš, the site was converted into a monastery in the Christian era. Over the centuries it endured repeated attacks by Mongols, Turks, and Kurds, during which the monastery, its artworks, and many manuscripts were abused and destroyed. Despite this, the monastery survives and today is headed by its abbot Mor Filüksinos (Philoxenos) Saliba Özmen.

Externally, the monastery's walls are famously yellow‑tinted. Inside are many ornate and beautiful structures, including the Domed Church, the Sayyida (Church of the Virgin Mary), the Church of the Patriarchal Throne, a mausoleum, and a garden structure known as the 'Paradise'.

The monastery, regarded as the "Mecca of Assyrians" and a jewel of Tur Abdin, continues to function as a monastic community, tourist site, and centre of learning, attracting thousands of visitors annually, in addition to its critical ecclesiastical functions since its inception. Syriac Orthodox culture was centred in two monasteries in western Tur Abdin, Mor Hananyo and Mor Gabriel.

== Name ==
The monastery was originally dedicated to Saint Solomon (Mor Shlemun), thought to have been its first abbot, persecuted under Byzantine emperor Justin I during his intense anti-Miaphysite policies, as described by Michael the Syrian. The modern name derives from Mor Hananyo (Saint Hananya), metropolitan of Mardin and Kafartut, who purchased and restored the ruined site in 793 and gave it new life. Patriarch Ignatius Aphrem I Barsoum believed Solomon to have been a disciple of Saint Augen, explaining why the monastery was sometimes also called Mor Hananyo & Augen.

The Arabic name Dayr al-Za'faran ("Saffron Monastery"), with its Syriac translation Dayro d-Kurkmo, is traced to the 15th century. Tradition recalls that a merchant carrying saffron (za'faran) passed by this monastery during its rebuilding. The abbot purchased the saffron from him, mixed it with lime, and used it for building the monastery, lending its walls their distinctive warm, yellowish hue. Another theory for the name is that saffron was cultivated in the surrounding area with records indicating its cultivation in the fields of a monastery near Nusaybin.

Thus, the monastery was initially called 'Mor Shlemun', then 'Mor Hananyo', then 'Mor Hananyo & Augen', and currently, it is referred to by both names 'Mor Hananyo' and 'Deyrulzafaran'.

== History ==
=== Early history ===
According to archaeological and traditional accounts, the site of the monastery was originally occupied by a temple dedicated to the Assyrian sun-god Šamaš, dating back to c. 2000 BC. The temple's massive stone vaults, constructed without mortar, are still preserved beneath the monastery. One of its windows is aligned to catch the sunrise, suggesting its use in ritual observances and sacrifices.

In late antiquity, the complex was transformed into a Roman citadel, later expanded into a Byzantine fortress. When the Romans abandoned the site in the late 5th century, it was converted into a Christian monastery by Mor Shlemon (Solomon) in 493 AD. Architectural remains from this period, including floor mosaics, are still visible within the monastery. The oldest surviving church, dedicated to the Virgin Mary, dates from the 5th–6th centuries and features four altars, with carved wooden sanctuaries added in 1699. It was raided and destroyed by the Persians in 607 AD when they conquered the region from Byzantine forces, leaving the monastery deserted afterwards.

Ananias (Hananyo) was educated and ordained as a monk at the Monastery of Mor Mattai near Mosul. He was later ordained as the metropolitan bishop of Mardin and Kafartut, undertaking major restoration of the monastery. He also established a grand library of manuscripts, and under his leadership, the monastic community grew to about 80 monks. From this period onward, the monastery became a prominent religious centre and has since borne his name as Mor Hananyo Monastery. Ananias was succeeded by his disciple Ignatius I in 816, who was the 80th bishop of the church and further expanded the monastery's structures and its library.

=== Medieval history ===
In 1034, the 67th Patriarch of Antioch, Dionysius IV Yahya (1031–1042), settled in Amid (modern-day Diyarbakır) after seeking the protection of the Muslim rulers. He also spent some time in Mor Hananyo, becoming the first patriarch to do so. The region was invaded by Islamic forces in 640, and in 1106, it came under the control of the Artukids. The monastery was later abandoned and re-founded by Yuhanon (John) IV, bishop of Mardin, who renovated the complex between 1125 and 1148, after which it was designated the patriarchal residence before his death on 12 July 1165. The region was devastated by Mongol invaders in 1394 and in subsequent years. In 1166, Patriarch Michael the Great was enthroned there, initiating nearly eight centuries of patriarchal presence.

During the 14th–15th centuries, the monastery endured devastation. In 1396, Tamerlane attacked Mardin for the second time, killing, looting, and taking many captives. As a result, some of its monasteries were destroyed, including the walls, cells, and the door of Mor Hananyo. Kurdish raiders inflicted great damage on the monastery and surrounding villages over the years as well, including in 1516. The monastery further deteriorated due to neglect. Patriarch Ignatius II rebuilt the monastery between 1696 and 1699, adding the Church of the Patriarchal Throne which was intended for synods and patriarchal elections. Later patriarchs would also gradually renovate it. The patriarchal throne and many relics are still located in the monastery, in addition to the tombs of various patriarchs.

=== Modern history ===
Since the 13th century, the monastery has faced repeated Kurdish incursions, looting, and desecration. The wider insecurity of southeastern Anatolia, where most Assyrian Christians lived, left their communities vulnerable to frequent raids by neighbouring Kurdish Muslim groups. As the patriarchal seat of the Church, the monastery was directly affected. Horatio Southgate, an American missionary who visited in the 19th century, noted that Mor Hananyo had been invaded and occupied by Kurds. Regional upheavals, including the rebellion of Badr Khan in the 1840s, brought devastation to Assyrians of both the Syriac Orthodox Church in Tur Abdin and the neighbouring Church of the East in Hakkari.

Some of the worst violence, however, was unleashed in the massacres beginning in 1895. During this period, the monastery was repeatedly occupied by Kurdish Muslims, who neglected and abused the site. Ancient manuscripts were destroyed, with some used as gunwadding for rifles or as kindling for fire, and clergy were powerless against local violence. The monastery's condition deteriorated rapidly, leaving it little more than a ruin by the time restoration was attempted. Despite this, the monastery also became a refuge for displaced villagers, particularly during the massacres of 1895. Syriac Orthodox manuscripts preserved at the monastery contain eyewitness accounts of the atrocities in Syriac, Arabic and Garshuni. There were widespread killings of men, women, childrenm and clergy; burnings of monasteries, homes, and churches; and the ransacking of villages across Mardin, Diyarbakır, and the surrounding regions. More than fifty villages were reported as emptied of their indigenous Assyrian population. Refugees who fled to the monastery were ordered by Ottoman officials to return to their ruined villages, where starvation, exposure, and renewed attacks caused further deaths. Contemporary letters also document appeals to the patriarch to intervene in cases of abduction and forced conversion, including an Armenian plea to rescue his wife and child from Kurdish captors who claim the wife converted to Islam after her kidnapping, and thus will not be returned. The violence has been described by scholars as a precursor to the Assyrian genocide of 1915.

The monastery itself sheltered hundreds of women, children, and the elderly during the crises. One account recalls that only the intervention of an Ottoman army officer, moved to pity by the state of the refugees, prevented the complete massacre of those inside. Nevertheless, the villages surrounding the monastery — including Bnabil, Dara, Bkeera, Qillath, al-Mansuriyah, Macsarta, Baval, Sour, al-Qusour, al-Qalsatma — were devastated, with their Christian populations eradicated. The destruction extended across Diyarbakır, Nusaybin, Azekh, and Siirt, where the Chaldean Catholic archbishop and scholar Addai Sher was murdered. Further looting of farmland and livestock was reported by villagers who resorted to begging to survive. A state of anarchy prevailed, with both ecclesiastical and local civil authorities rendered helpless before the tyranny of Kurdish tribes, who operated undeterred under the blessing of the Ottoman state. They pillaged, murdered, raped, kidnapped, and harassed the indigenous Christians of the monastery and surrounding villages, who were also subjected to forced conversion to Islam against their will. The violence reflected deep-rooted attitudes that persisted long after these events.

During the Seferberlik massacres, part of the 1915 Assyrian genocide, Kurdish tribes besieged the monastery, intent on killing refugees from surrounding villages. One Assyrian man disguised himself to smuggle food past the besiegers.

Despite centuries of upheaval, Mor Hananyo remained the patriarchal seat of the Syriac Orthodox Church for nearly a millennium. This ended in 1924, soon after the establishment of the Turkish Republic, when Patriarch Ignatius Elias III received a telegram from Mustafa Kemal Atatürk delivered via the governor of Mardin, declaring:

The clerical leader in the black cassock [the Patriarch] should leave Turkey immediately and should never ever return!

The patriarch was stripped of Turkish citizenship, and the patriarchate relocated first to Homs, and then to Damascus, where it remains today as the Syriac Orthodox Patriarchal Archdiocese of Damascus. Mor Hananyo, however, would continue to function as a monastic centre, despite everything.

Over its history, at least 21 Syriac Orthodox synods were convened there, the last on 30 November 1916, when Ignatius Elias III was elected Patriarch of Antioch.

== Church architecture ==
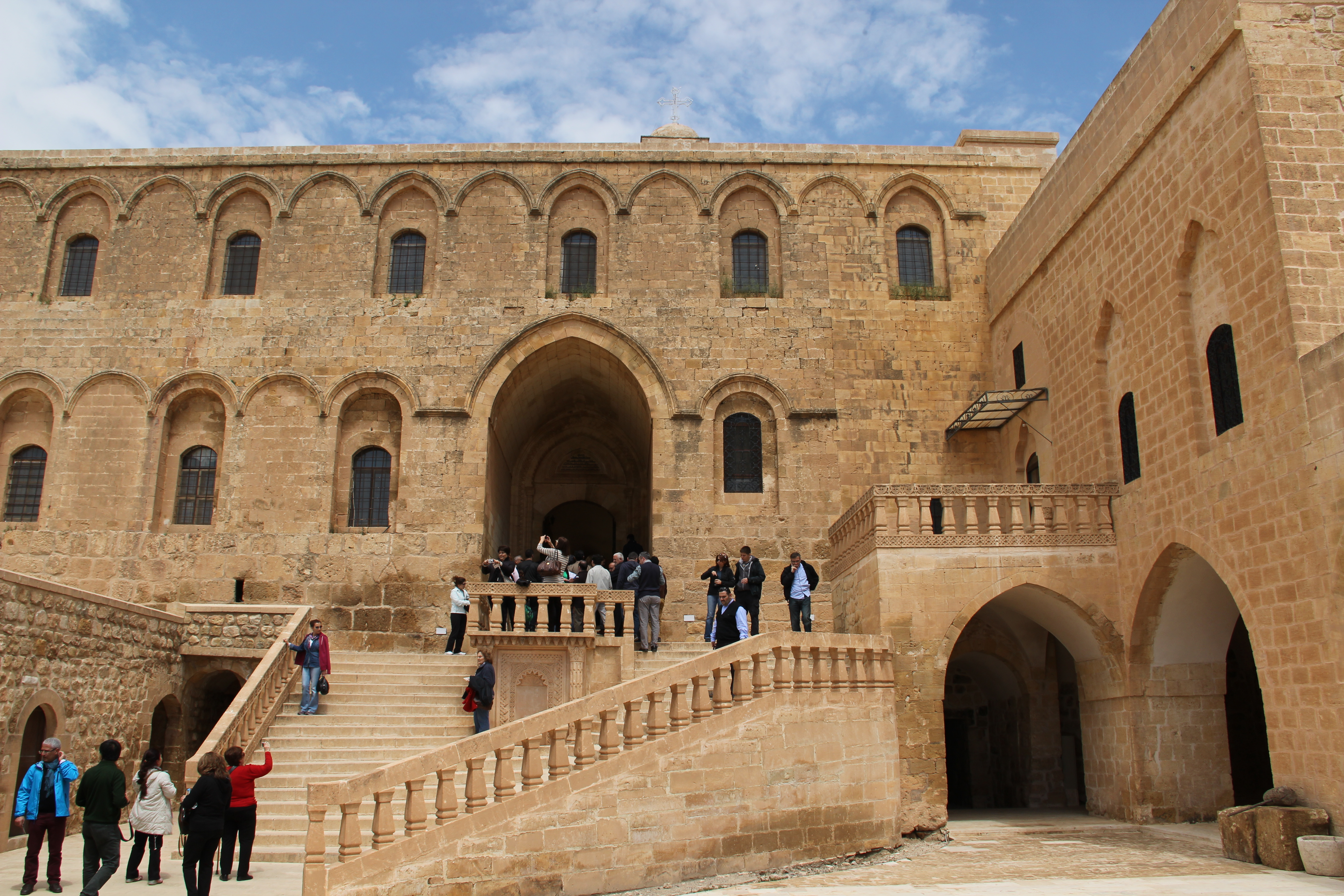
Courtyard at the entrance of the monastery

Mor Hananyo Monastery is one of the main centres of the Syriac Orthodox Church, renowned for its magnificent architecture. The various churches and buildings of the monastery still preserve a significant amount of the original decoration and sculpture, many of which exhibit very high artistic quality. The monastery is regarded as one of the largest and most influential in Mesopotamia. It is situated on a mound approximately 3 km east of the city of Mardin, Turkey. The monastery measures about 71 × 63 m, fortified by a strong wall, and is surrounded by water channels. Its courtyard features porches on four sides facing one another, and in the middle are two large cisterns fed from nearby springs through aqueducts that were used for storing fresh water during winter and spring.

The complex is constructed on several levels, with two storeys across most of the site and three storeys in the southern section. These higher structures, considered the best-preserved parts of the monastery, contain the patriarchal apartments and the monks' cells. The construction is irregular, which reflects centuries of additions and reconstruction. Remains of the earliest building phases, made from large carved stones and bricks, can still be seen in the churches and the vaults of the lower storey.

The monastery incorporates a variety of ecclesiastical buildings: the Domed Church of Mor Hananyo, the Church of the Virgin Mary (Sayyida), the Church of the Patriarchal Throne, the Mausoleum of the Fathers (Beth Qadisheh), and a garden structure known as the Paradise. In addition, St Peter's Church and accommodation for patriarchs, metropolitans, and clergy are part of the compound.

One of the most striking architectural features is the so-called Sun Temple, an underground vault beneath the main courtyard. This structure predates the monastery and is approximately 4500 years old, originally dedicated to the Mesopotamian sun-god Šamaš. The ceiling, constructed with massive stones fitted without mortar using interlocking techniques, has remained intact for millennia, going all the way back to ancient Assyrian times. A window in its eastern wall was aligned to capture the first rays of sunrise, likely used in ritual sacrifice. The chamber's stone blocks, some weighing up to one tonne and standing two metres high, are held together without mortar, with a central keystone locking them in place. The temple comprises two rooms, one covered by stone vaults and the other by a ceiling of fitted blocks. This subterranean sanctuary represents the oldest preserved part of the monastery. Located to the north of the monastery are three smaller monasteries: one dedicated to the Theotokos (Syriac: ܝܘܠܕܬ ܐܠܗܐ, romanised: Yoldāth Alāhā, lit. 'Mother of God'), also known as 'Our Lady of the Dripping Water'; one to Mor Ozoziel; and one to Jacob of Serug, who is dubbed 'the Teacher'.

=== Main Church (Domed Church) ===
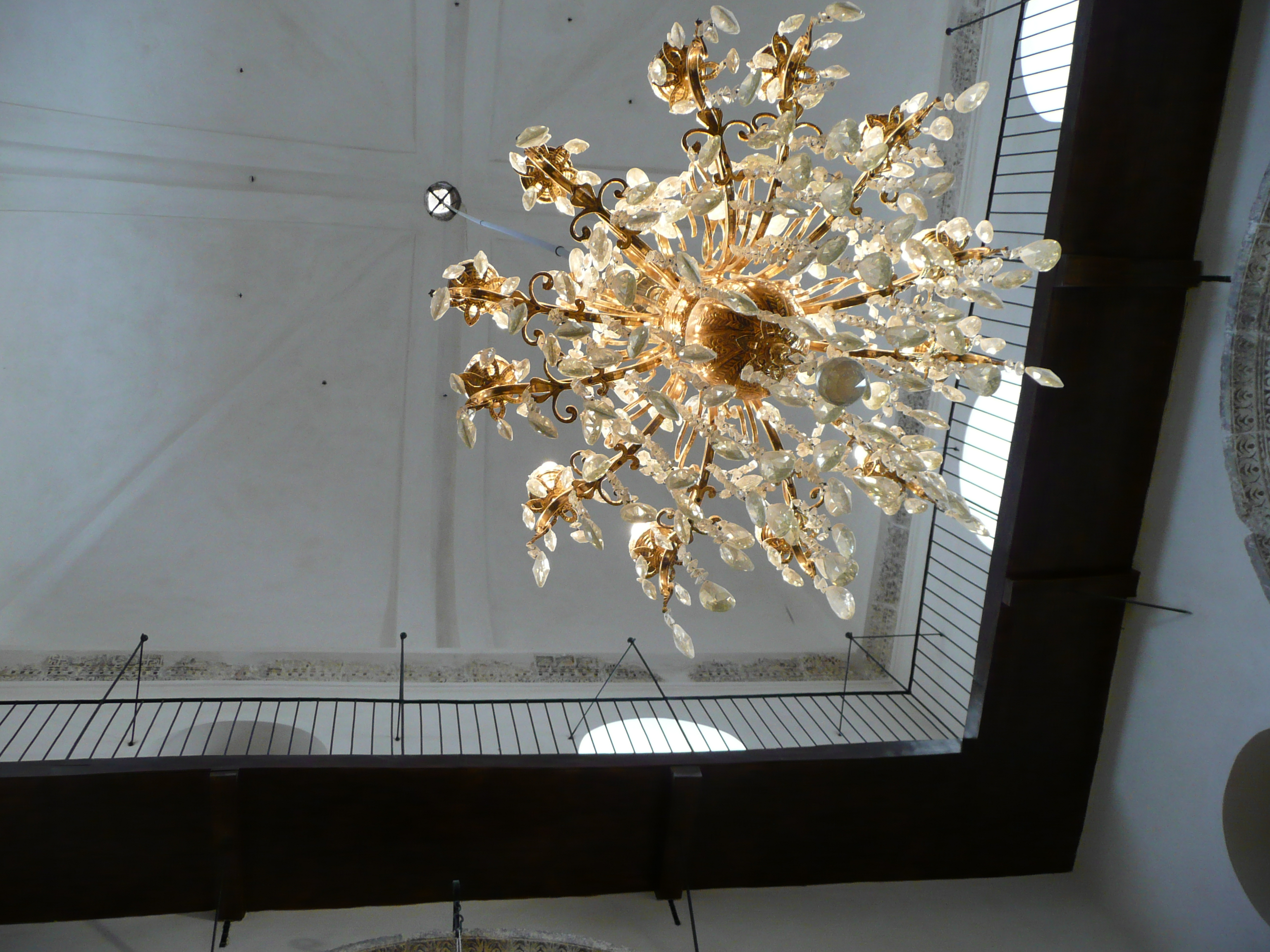
Mor Hananyo Church was also known as the Domed Church because of its cross-shaped dome

The church located in the east wing of the monastery was meticulously built by Mor Hananyo (793–816) himself, which is why it is also named after him. The structure remains intact more than eleven centuries on. It was here that Patriarch Michael the Great was enthroned in 1166, followed by subsequent patriarchs.

The building is shaped like a cross and measures 17.7 × 12.3 m; it is regarded as exceptionally beautiful. Byzantine Emperor Anastasius I Dicorus (491–518) is said to have commissioned its construction, carried out by the Assyrian architects Theodosius and Theodore. Its dome is shaped in the form of a cross, which has earned it the name 'Domed Church'. The surface area measures 271 m^{2}, and the interior height rises to 17.7 m.

The outer walls bear various animal motifs, while the southern gate is decorated with inscriptions narrating episodes from the life of Jesus, though many have faded with time. The same gate also contains the Greek letters Alpha and Omega (Α and Ω), echoing Revelation 22:13 and symbolising Christ as the beginning and the end.

Internally, the church was once adorned with frescoes, but only a single depiction of St Ananias survives, tall and narrow in form. Its rich altar was historically laden with gold and silver. Wooden service platforms to the north and south of the apse date from 1699, though the central platform was destroyed by fire in 1941, leaving only two columns intact.

The church has six gates in total, and although Patriarch Ignatius Abded Mshiho II ordered plastering of the walls in 1903, which obscured some of the original decoration, a portrait of St Ananias himself is still preserved in the southern section.

=== Temple of the Sun (Shamash Temple) ===
Temple of the Sun in the basement with a small hole in its eastern wall

This underground sanctuary, dating back to c. 2000 BC, predates the Christian monastery and was originally utilised for solar worship by the ancient Assyrians of the region.

The ceiling is supported by immense stones, standing two metres tall and weighing 500–1,000 kg each. These stones are ingeniously fitted without mortar through interlocking methods that have preserved their stability for millennia. At the eastern end, there is a small opening that allows the rays of the rising sun to penetrate directly to the altar, where sacrifices were offered to the sun god Shamash.

The temple is formed of two rooms, one smaller chamber covered by stone vaults, and a larger one with a ceiling of vast unmortared blocks. The monastery itself symbolically preserves the solar theme with 365 rooms, each representing a day of the year. The first rays of the sun enter the temple through a small opening in its eastern wall every morning.

=== Mausoleum of the Fathers ===
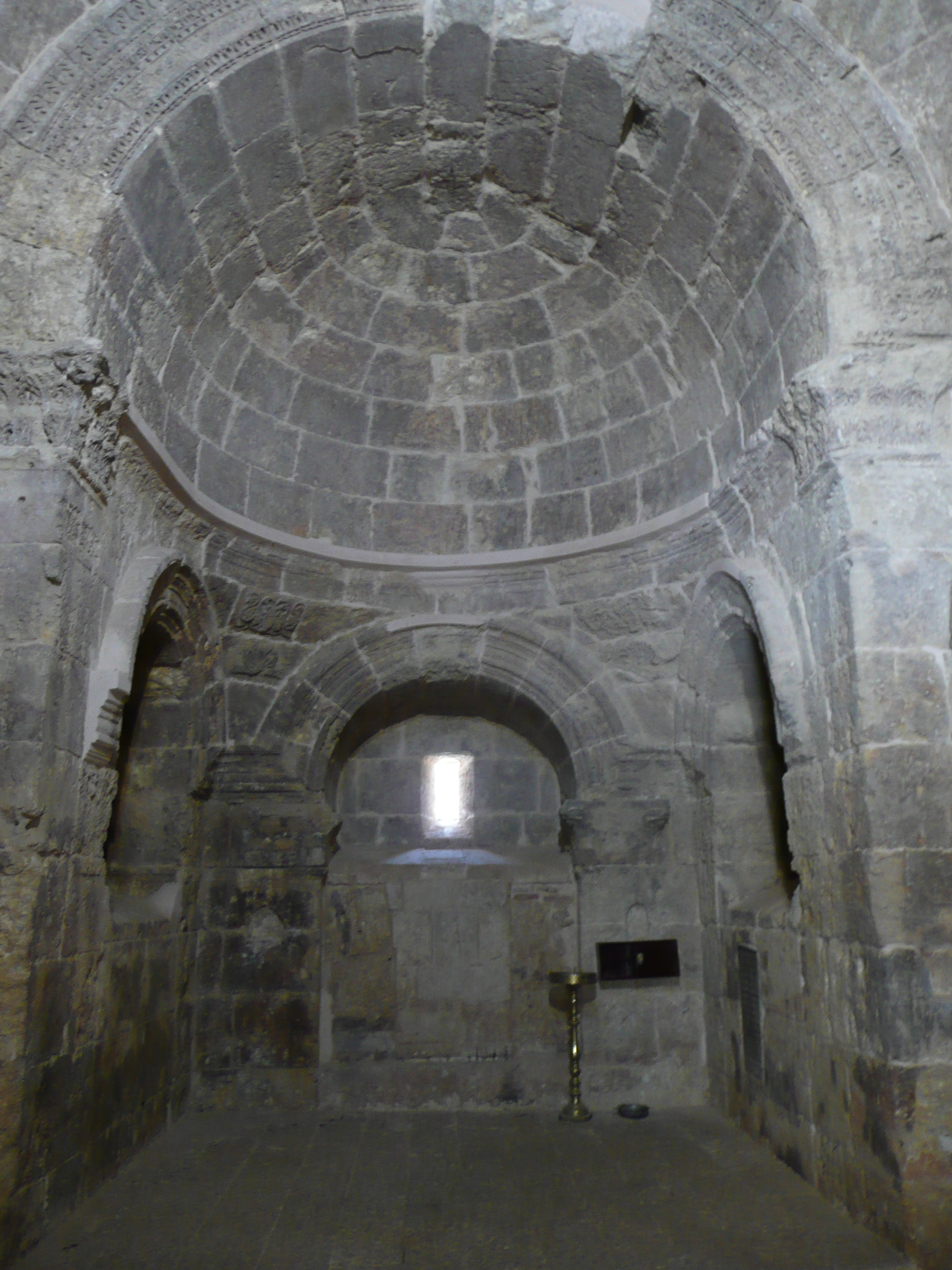
Beth Qadisheh (House of Saints), the tomb of several patriarchs, saints, and metropolitans

Also called the Beth Qadisheh (Syriac: ܒܝܬ ܩܕܝܫܗ, romanised: House of Saints), this mausoleum is located on the southeastern façade of the Domed Church. It measures 10.5 × 5.4 m. The doors to this chamber are double doors of walnut, dating back 300 years. The chamber contains seven burial niches, three of which are reserved for patriarchs. Altogether, the bones of 53 patriarchs, metropolitans, and saints are interred here across several chambers, including those of Saint Hananya himself.

Stone carvings embellish the interior, including grape clusters, vases with rods protruding, and seashells in semi-circular niches. Above the doorway is a cross surrounded by dolphins. Inscriptions in Estrangelo and Serto Syriac scripts record the sanctity of the space, one explicitly stating 'Entombed here are the remains of saints'. The structure was renovated in 1884 by Patriarch Peter IV, the last patriarch later entombed there in 1894.

=== Church of Virgin Mary (Sayyida Church) ===
The Church of the Virgin Mary, also called Sayyida, stands in the northern section of the monastery. It dates back to the 5th–6th centuries and is regarded as the original church of the complex. Measuring 10.75 × 14.25 m, it is spacious and venerable.

The church contains four altars, each with a finely crafted wooden Holy of Holies built in 1699, some inscribed with verses from the Psalms. Three handmade wooden doors, also from 1699, bear additional Syriac inscriptions of the Psalms of David.

Inside, mosaics of the Byzantine era decorate the apse, and some of the ceilings and walls are built of baked brick in a Byzantine style. An octagonal baptismal font for adults remains in use today for baptism ceremonies.

Patriarch Jirjis II restored parts of the church in the late 17th century. It remains one of the central liturgical spaces of the monastery.

=== Church of the Patriarchal Throne ===
Above the Church of the Virgin Mary to the south lies the Church of the Patriarchal Throne, built by Patriarch Jirjis II between 1696 and 1699 in honour of Saint Peter. Measuring 17.5 × 9.25 m, it was intended as the venue for patriarchal synods to convene and elect new patriarchs. Renovations and decorations were later added by Patriarchs Shukr Allah (1727), Jirjis IV (1773), and Jirjis V (1830). The altar front bears inscriptions from the Gospels in Estrangelo script, while a nearby Serto Syriac inscription states that relics of saints rest at the site, making it an important symbolic space within the monastery. The throne itself stands on the eastern side of the church and is fashioned of marble, richly ornamented with carvings.

=== The Paradise (Dayr al-Firdaws) ===
Adjoining the eastern side of the Sayyida Church is a smaller chamber known as the 'Paradise' (Dayr al-Firdaws), which served as a burial chamber for bishops and dignitaries. Measuring 6.5 × 5.7 m, it contains six stone graves covered with arches. There is a bountiful spring nearby known as Jroun Spring, along with mulberry trees.

The chamber walls bear decorative carvings, including crosses and geometric designs. A Syriac inscription records its dedication as a place for interring the righteous, and Byzantine-style mosaics survive on the floor.

Traditionally, it was considered a particularly sanctified place within the monastery, reserved for ascetics who had achieved high spiritual standing. Renovations carried out during the 18th century reinforced the structure while preserving its original style.

== Manuscripts and scholarship ==
A significant library was established at the monastery during the renovations under Ananias in the late eighth century. Over the following centuries, the monks of Mor Hananyo produced and copied a large number of manuscripts covering a wide range of subjects, bearing witness to their diverse intellectual interests. These manuscripts extended far beyond religious literature. For example, a codex copied in 1308–09 contains the Syriac translation of Ptolemy's Tetrabiblon alongside Severus Sebokht's Treatise on the Constellations.

Among the most celebrated works preserved is the Lectionary of Deir ez-Za‘faran, copied in the mid-thirteenth century by Dioscorus Theodorus, later bishop of Hesna d‑Ziyad (Kharput). The manuscript contains twenty miniatures, elaborate ornaments of colourful circles, stars, and crosses, and full-page decorative crosses introducing the canon tables. The frontispiece is set under a gold portion, and the interlaced borders in red, blue, and yellow closely follow Byzantine iconographic models. Unlike many contemporaneous manuscripts, the physiognomic rendering of its figures was not 'Islamicised' but retained a distinct Syriac Christian aesthetic.

The monastery also preserves a Bible of considerable historical value and a sacred stone traditionally associated with the founding of the first school of medicine in the region. Among the renowned scholars connected with the monastery are Iwannis, metropolitan of Dara (8th–9th century), Patriarch Ignatius Aphrem I Barsoum (1933–1957), and Metropolitan Mor Philoxenos Yuhanon Dolabani (1947–1969). Mor Philoxenos Saliba Özmen, ordained Metropolitan of Mardin in 2003, also resides at Mor Hananyo.

Despite its prestige, the library suffered catastrophic losses through time, looting, and repeated pillaging. It suffered devastation by Turks, by the Mongols under Tamerlane, and later by Kurdish tribes, who used precious manuscripts either as rifle wadding or kindling for fires. Even so, today the library of Mor Hananyo still contains more than 300 Syriac and Arabic manuscripts, the oldest dating to the 9th century, covering theology, patristics, scripture, law, grammar, philology, asceticism, rituals, and history, authored by both Greek and Syriac writers of various traditions, including Miaphysite and Nestorian.

In 1928, Metropolitan Yuhanon Dolabani compiled a Syriac facsimile catalogue of all manuscripts in the monastery, which was translated into Arabic in Damascus in 2002 by Yohanna Ibrahim and later into English by Matti Moosa.

=== Printing press ===
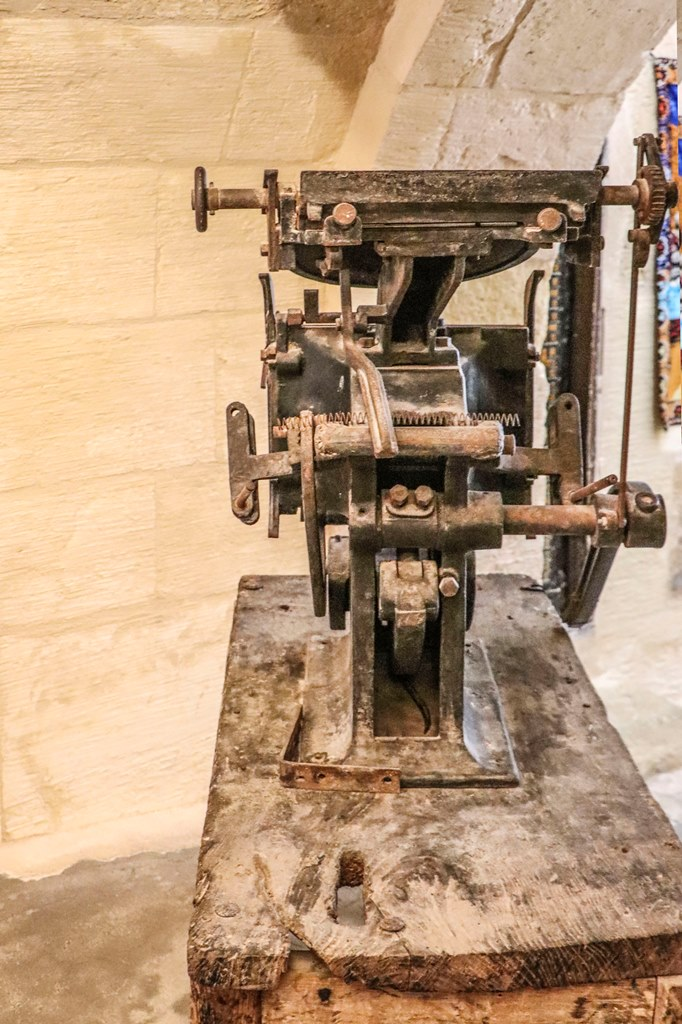
Printing press at the monastery

The monastery of Mor Hananyo holds a remarkable position in the history of printing in the Middle East. In 1874, Patriarch Peter IV and Archbishop Gregorios journeyed to England and acquired a printing press, which was transported to Aleppo by Antonius Azar before being installed at the monastery in 1881. A dedicated printing-house was constructed on the site in 1882. An additional press had already been brought from England in the 1880s as a backup and was installed in Jerusalem.

The first book printed in the monastery appeared in 1888, and a copy was sent to Queen Victoria. Subsequently, the press remained active until 1917, producing books in Syriac, Arabic, and Turkish, in addition to the periodical Hikmet (Syriac: ܚܟܡܬܐ, romanised: Ḥekmṯo, lit. 'Wisdom') in 1913–1914. During the era of the Turkish Republic, the monastery's press was used to print official documents, as it was the only printing facility available in the region. Publications continued until 1969; additionally, a monthly magazine titled Öz Hikmet was printed until 1953.

Today some of the surviving works printed at Mor Hananyo are on display within the monastery, and others are exhibited at Kırklar Church (Mor Behnam) in Mardin.

== Modern-day significance ==
Mor Hananyo served as the seat of the Syriac Orthodox Patriarchate from c. 1160–1932 when it was relocated to Homs and later to Damascus, marking the end of its nearly eight‑century tenure as the ecclesiastical centre of the Syriac Orthodox Church.

The monastery is one of the oldest still-functioning sacred sites in Mesopotamia. So great is the significance of the site to Assyrian Christians worldwide and their deep-rooted heritage in their homeland, that (in 2013) the monastery attracted over 109,000 visitors, and most were non-residents of Mardin, even though only about 4,000 Assyrians lived in Mardin. There continues to be an influx of visitors seeking to experience the site's historic spiritual and architectural legacy, and many locals refer to it as the "Mecca of Assyrians".

Mor Hananyo is still a key player in Syriac liturgical observances, with services still being provided in Classical Syriac — one of the oldest liturgical languages of Christianity. The upper floor is still occupied by visiting guests including the patriarch who occasionally visits from time to time.

Complementing the monastery's significance, its enduring presence marks part of larger efforts by Assyrian communities to reclaim and maintain their cultural and religious identity in their ancestral region.

=== Tourism ===
Today, the monastery functions both as a religious site and a tourist attraction. Open to visitors during designated hours, it offers guided tours and has a café, souvenir shop, and occasional displays of locally produced Assyrian wine called Dzafaran. It is situated in Tur Abdin, a historically Assyrian region, and is preparing for potential World Heritage recognition under UNESCO's Tentative List programme.

Admission to the monastery is 100₺ (as of September 2024) and it is open every day. Guided tours are sometimes conducted in Turkish, but many of the local clergymen also speak English. Visitors must wear appropriate attire.

== Gallery ==
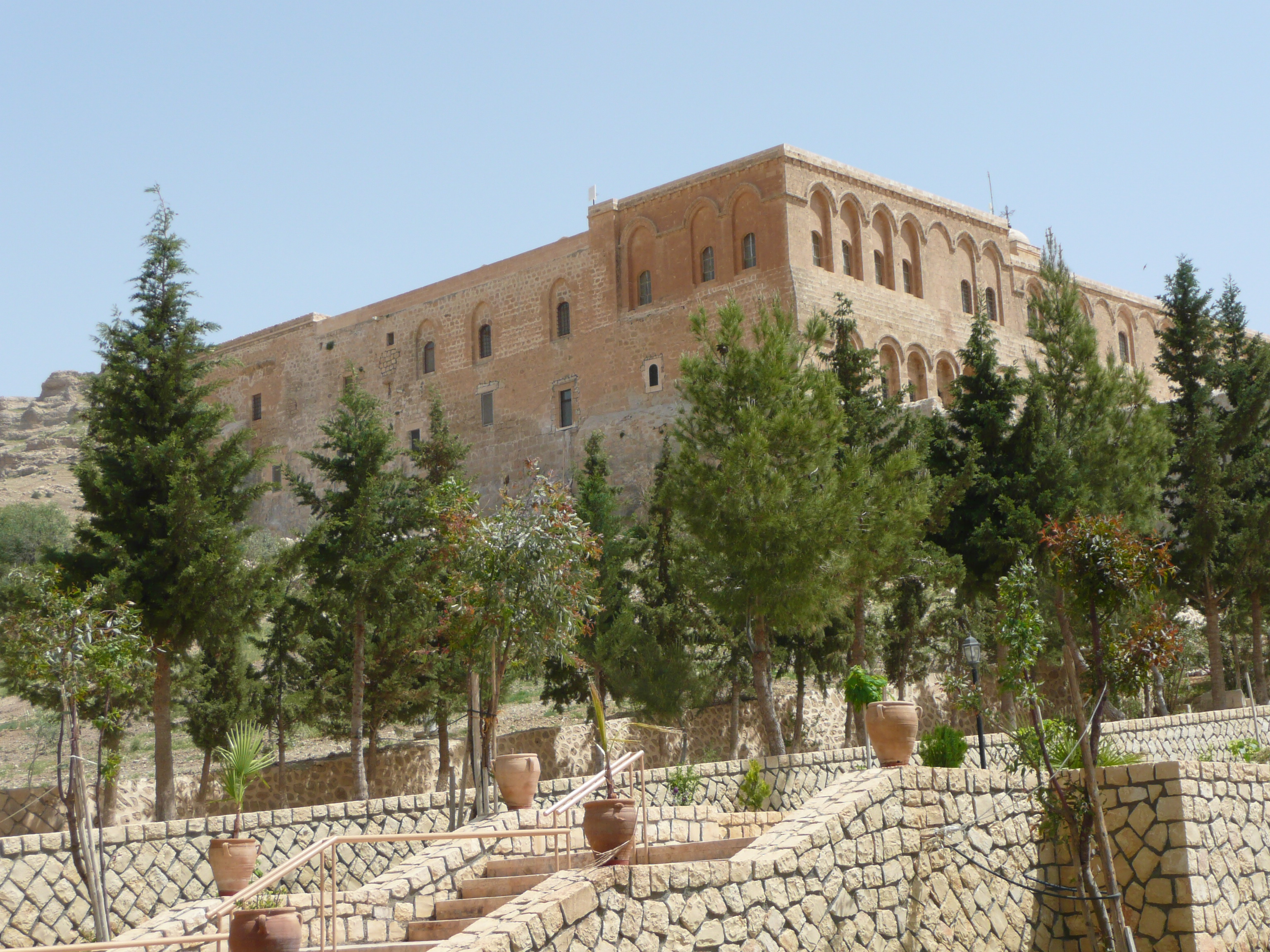
The Saffron Monastery

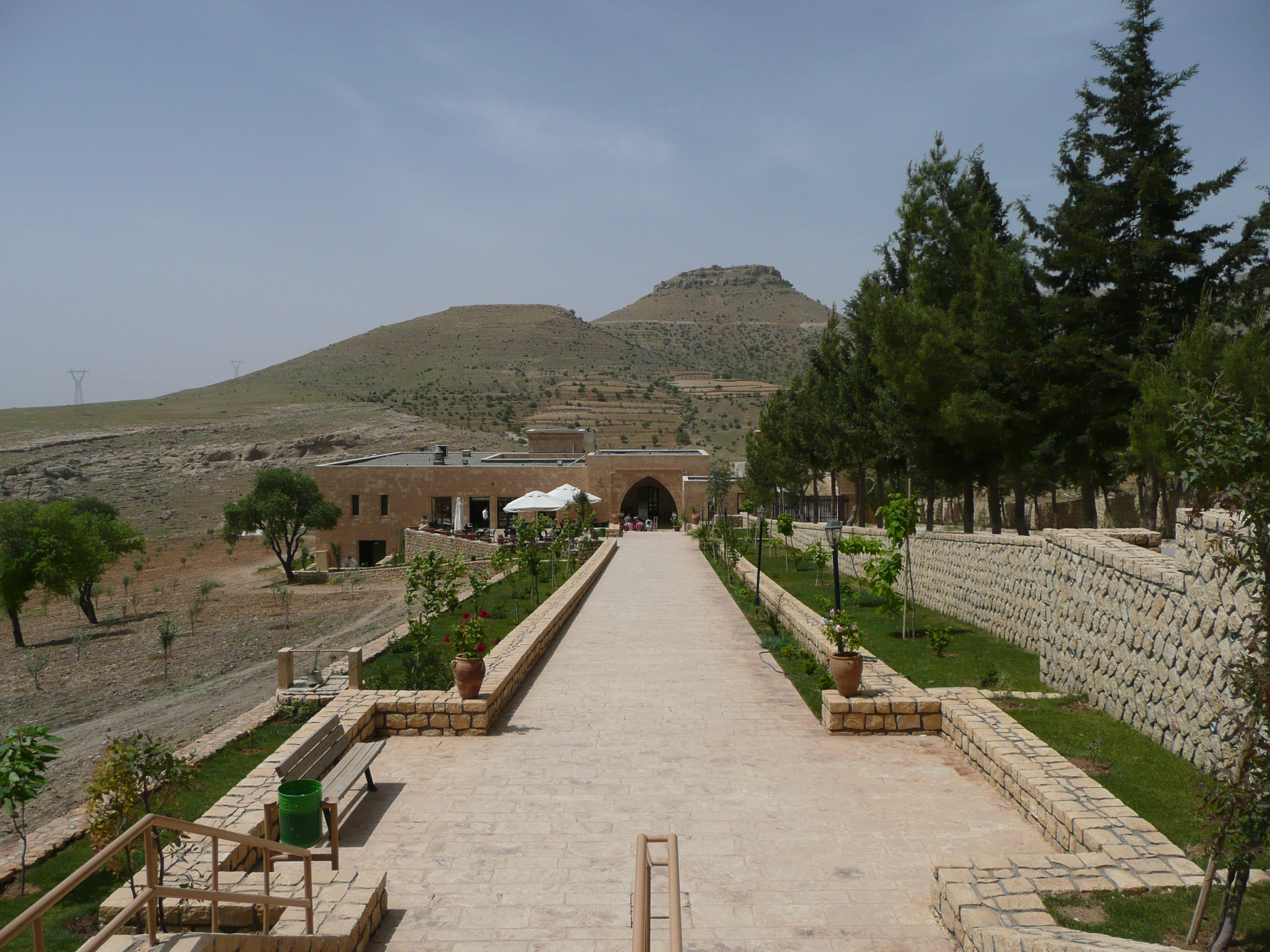
The tree-lined path to the monastery

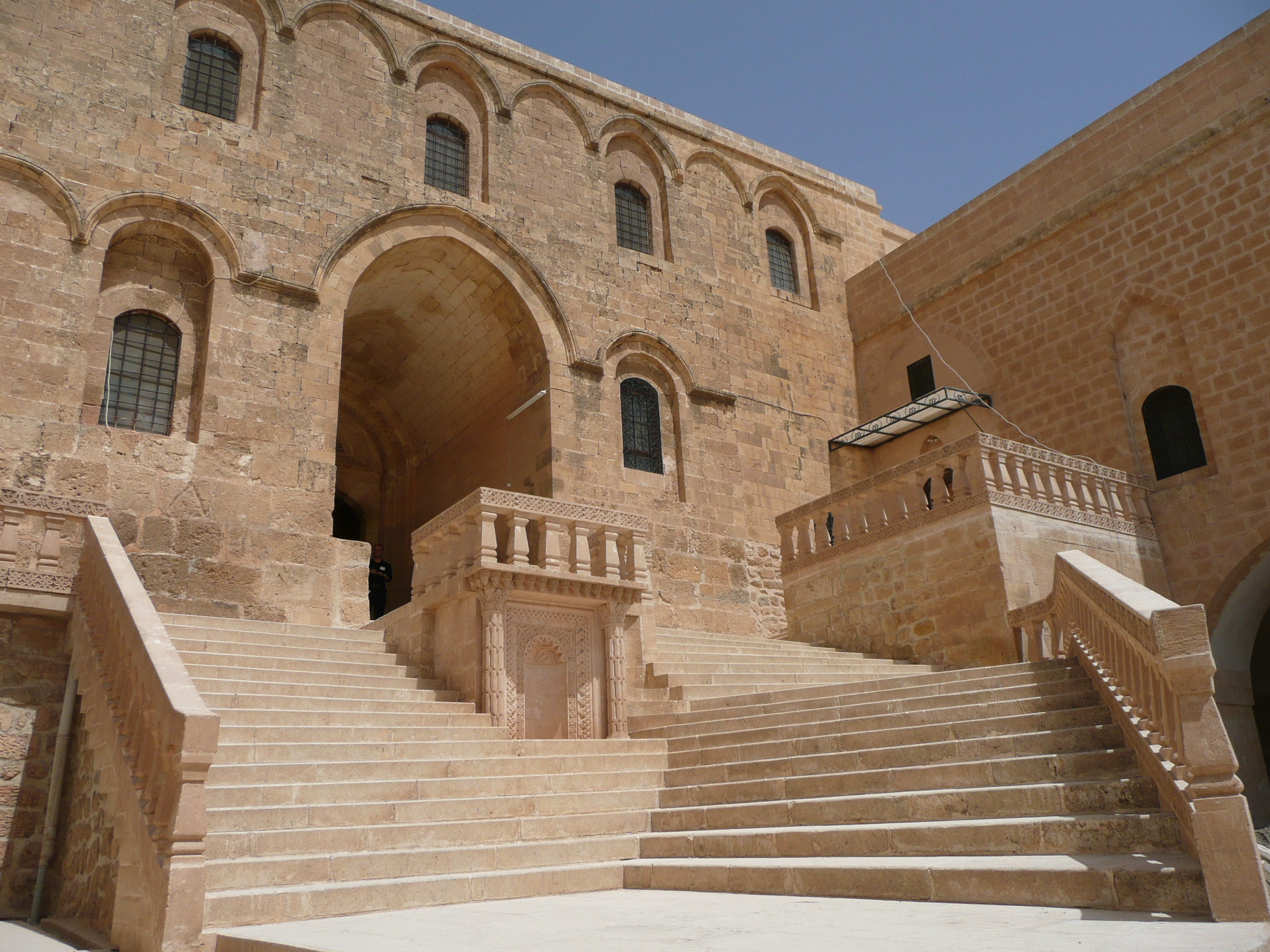
The main entrance, accessed from the outer courtyard

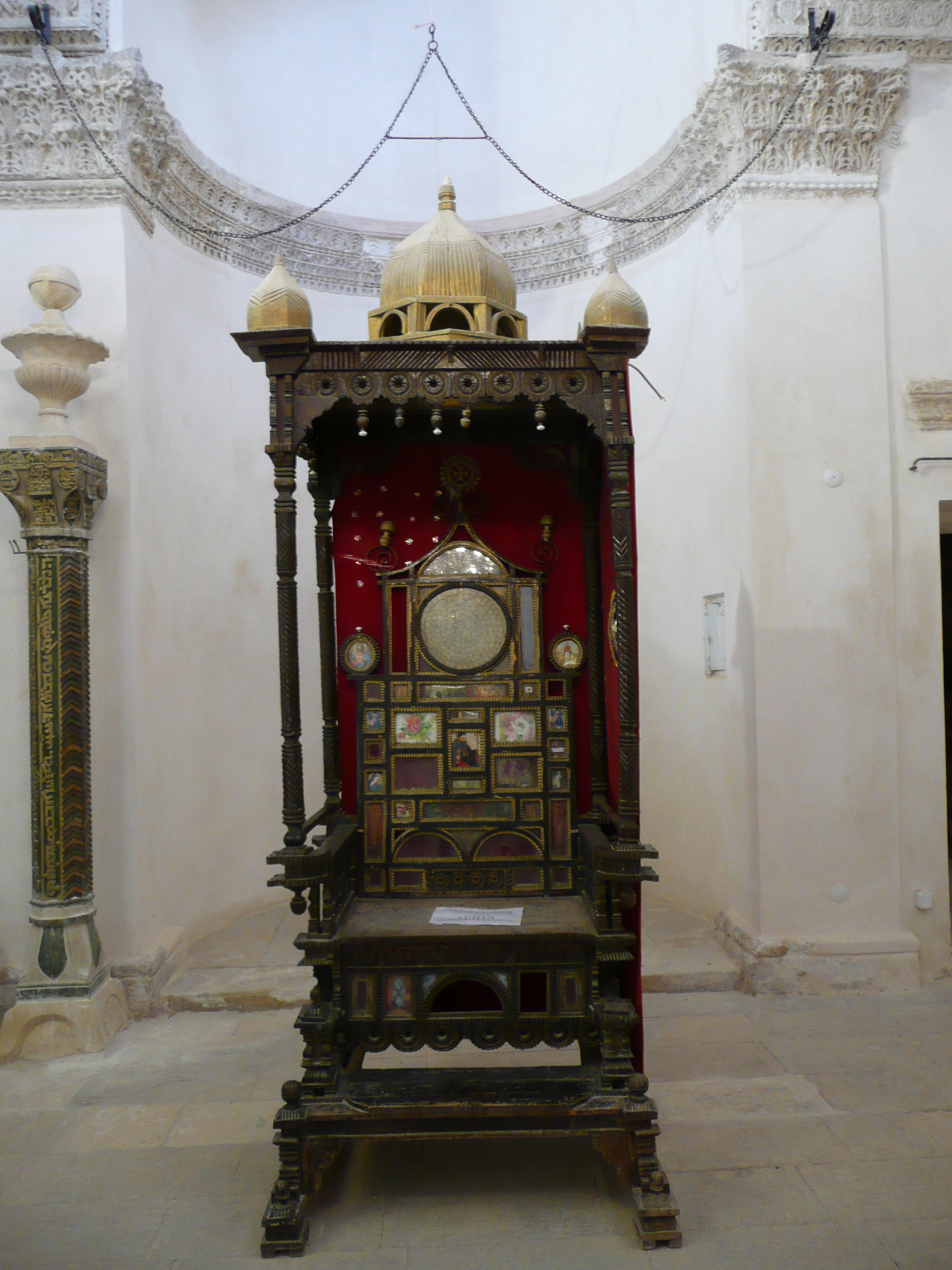
The Patriarchal Throne

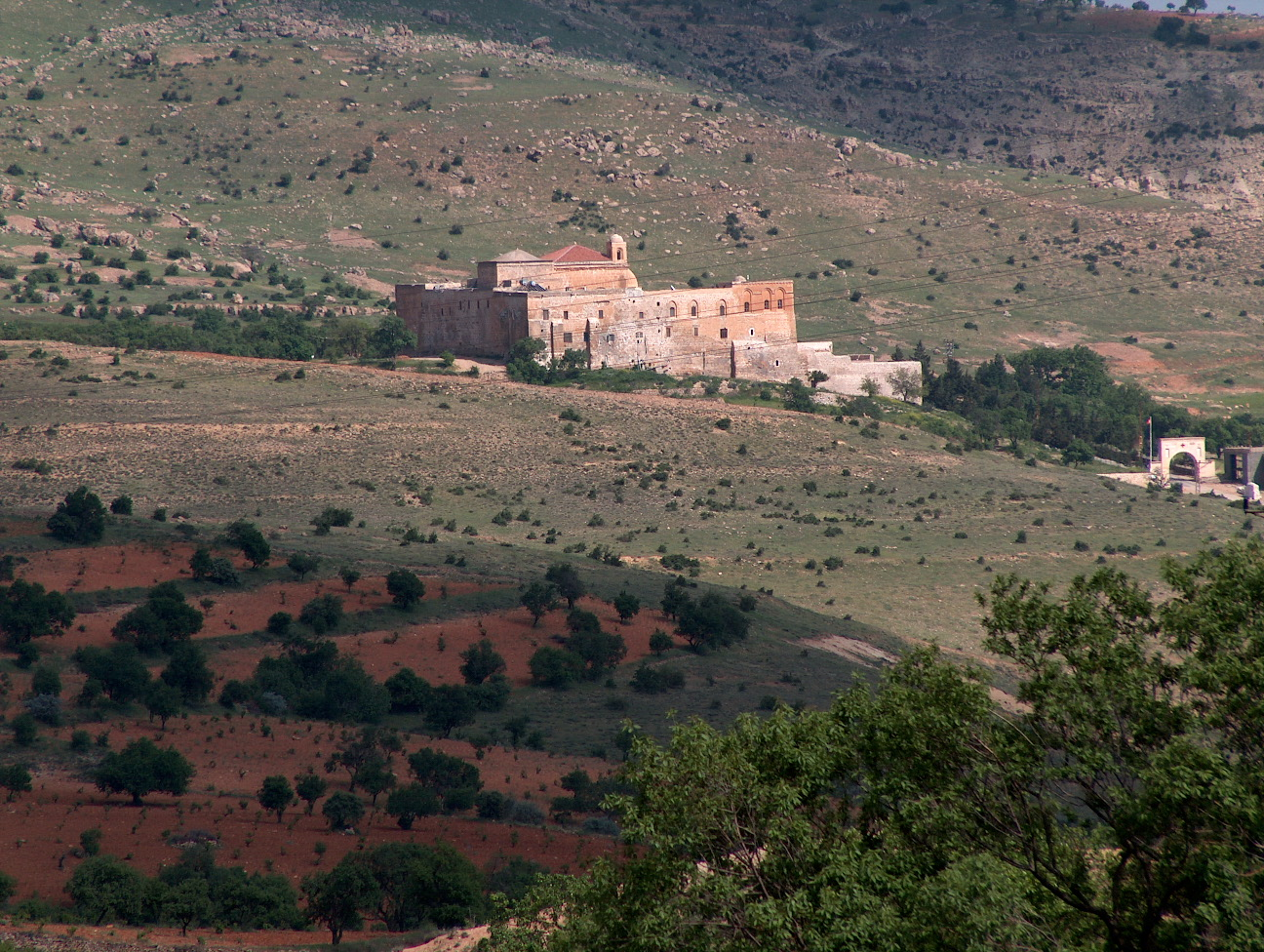
Mor Hananyo Monastery with its farms in the background

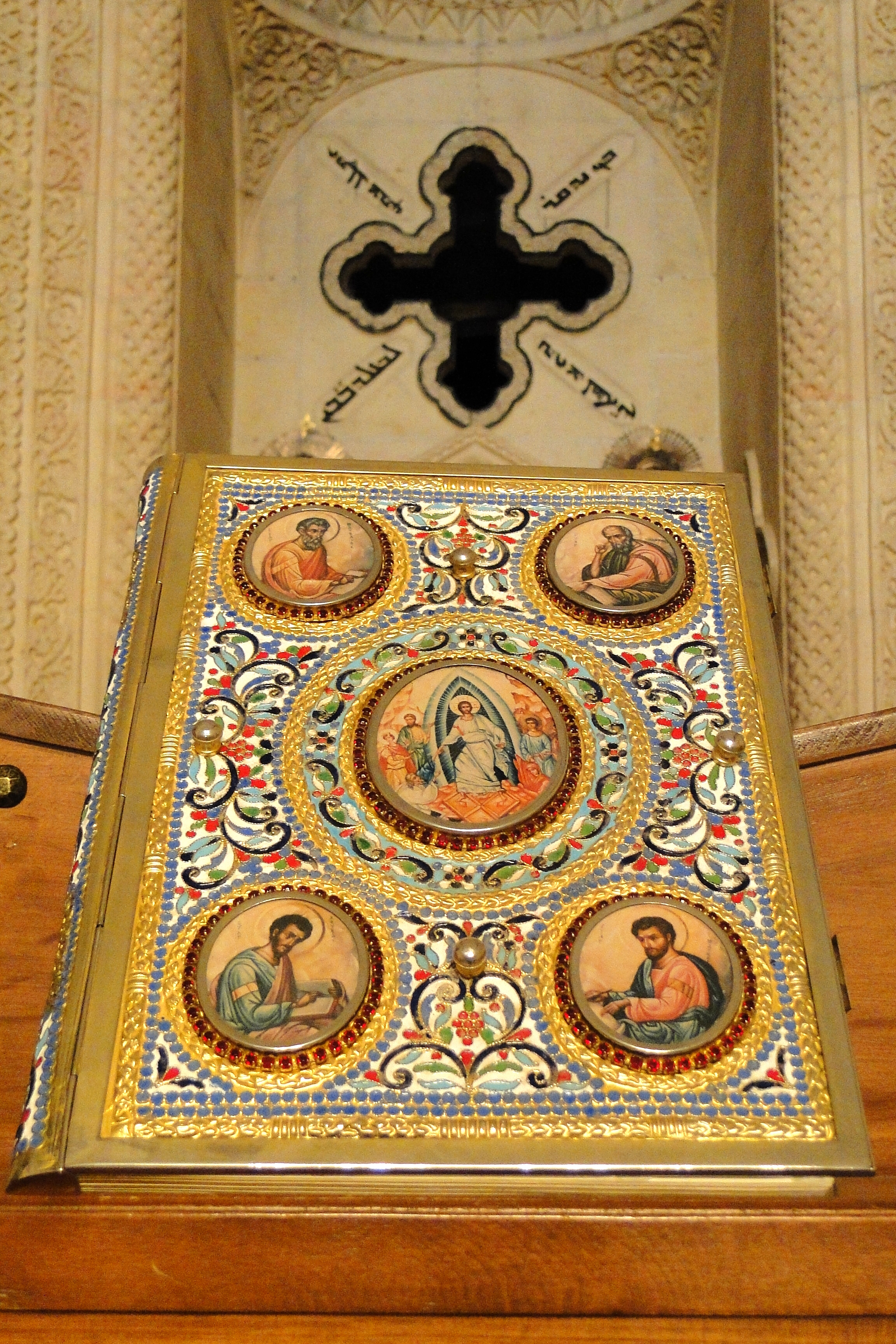
Bible and pulpit

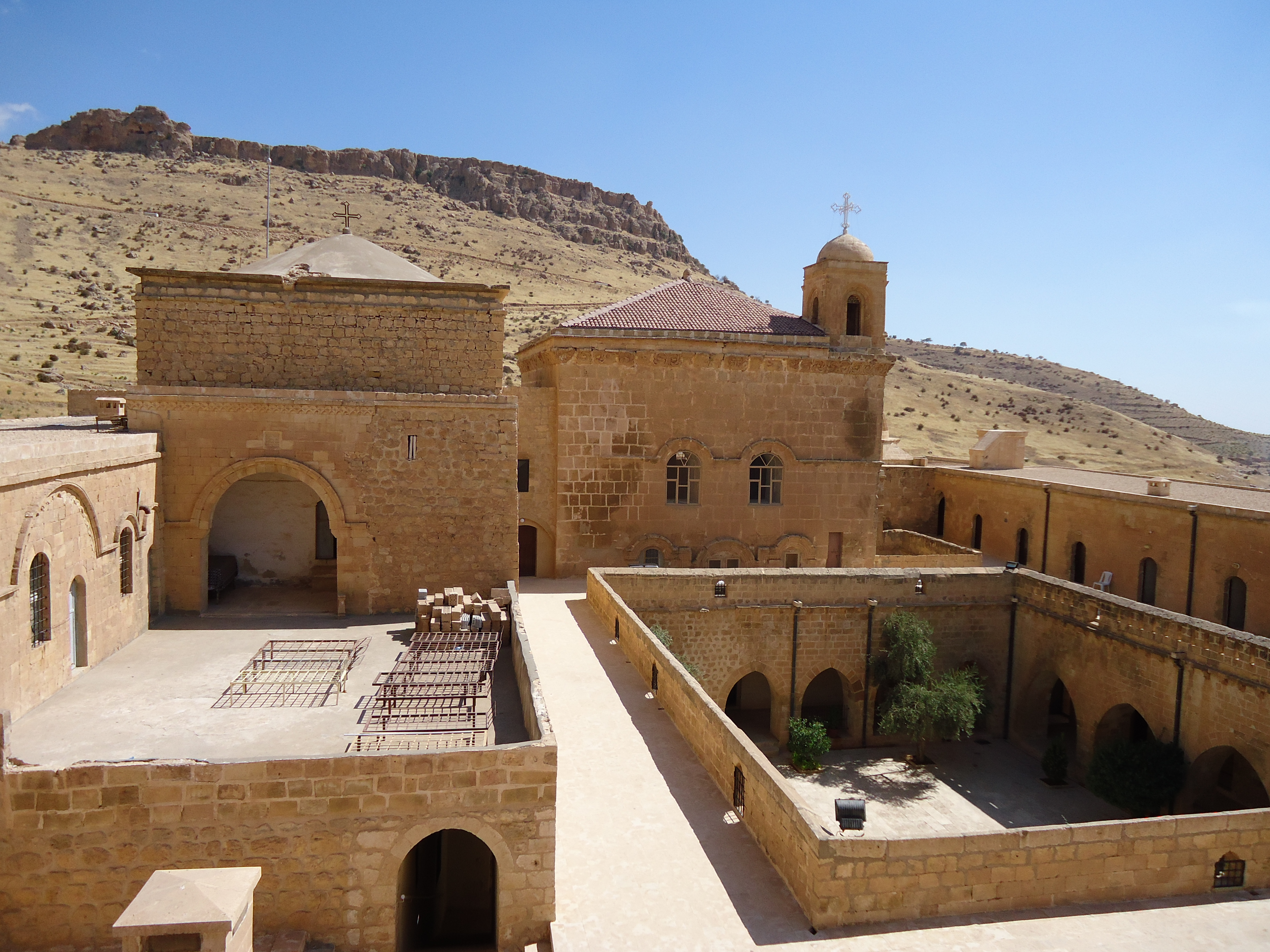
The main inner courtyard

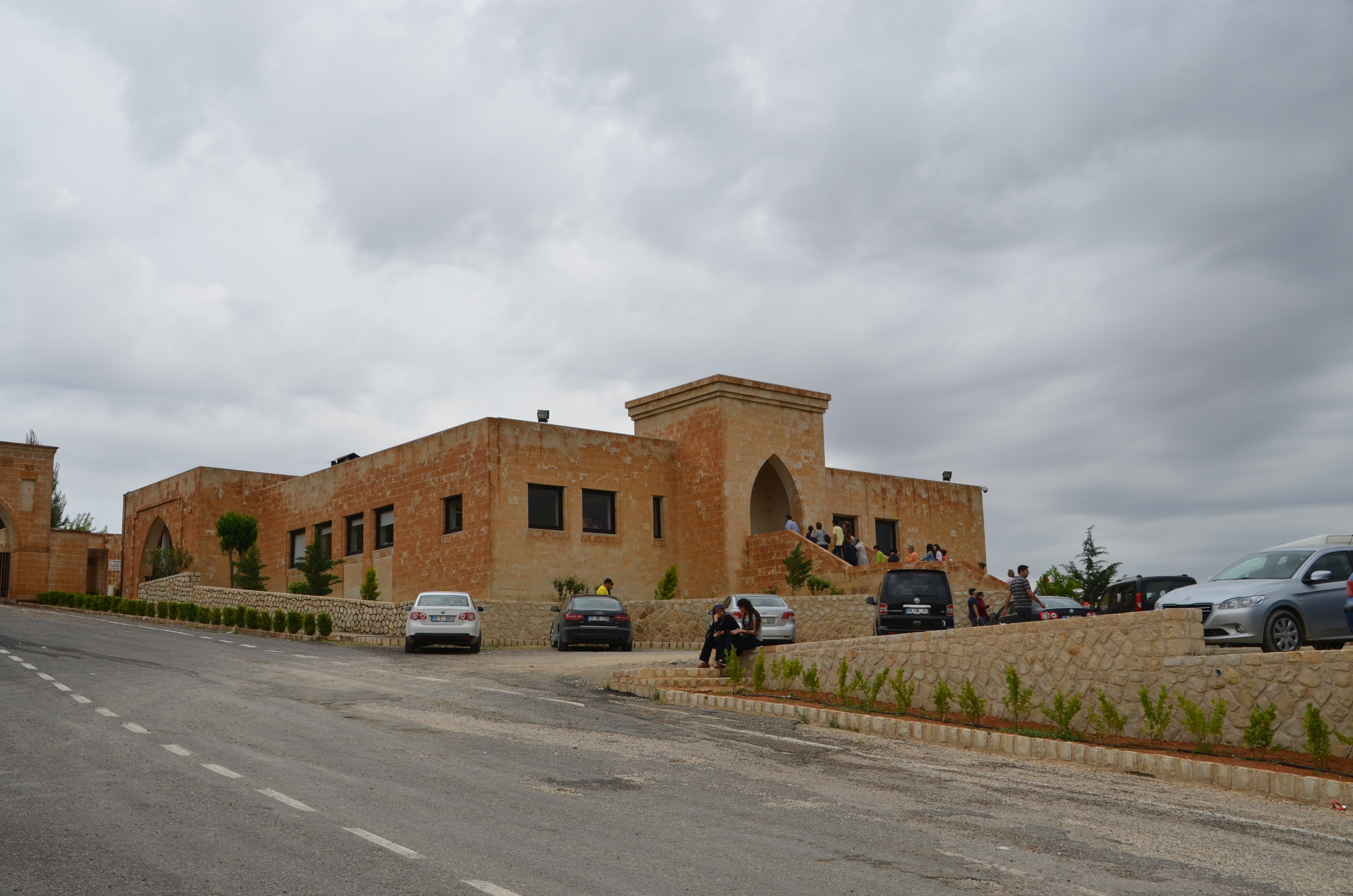
New block beside the entrance gate of the monastery housing a wine shop and a small museum

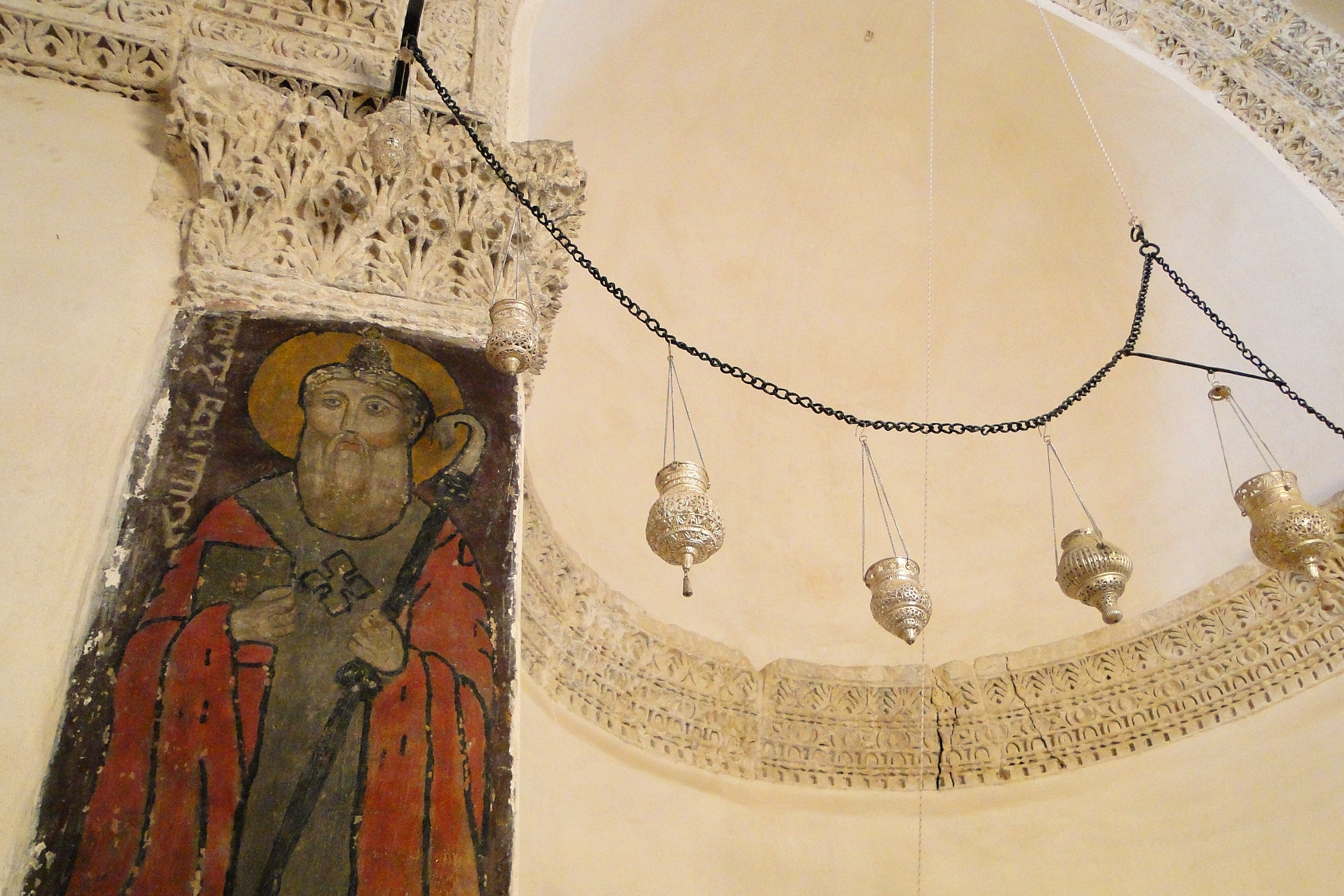
Domed Church containing a portrait of Saint Hananya

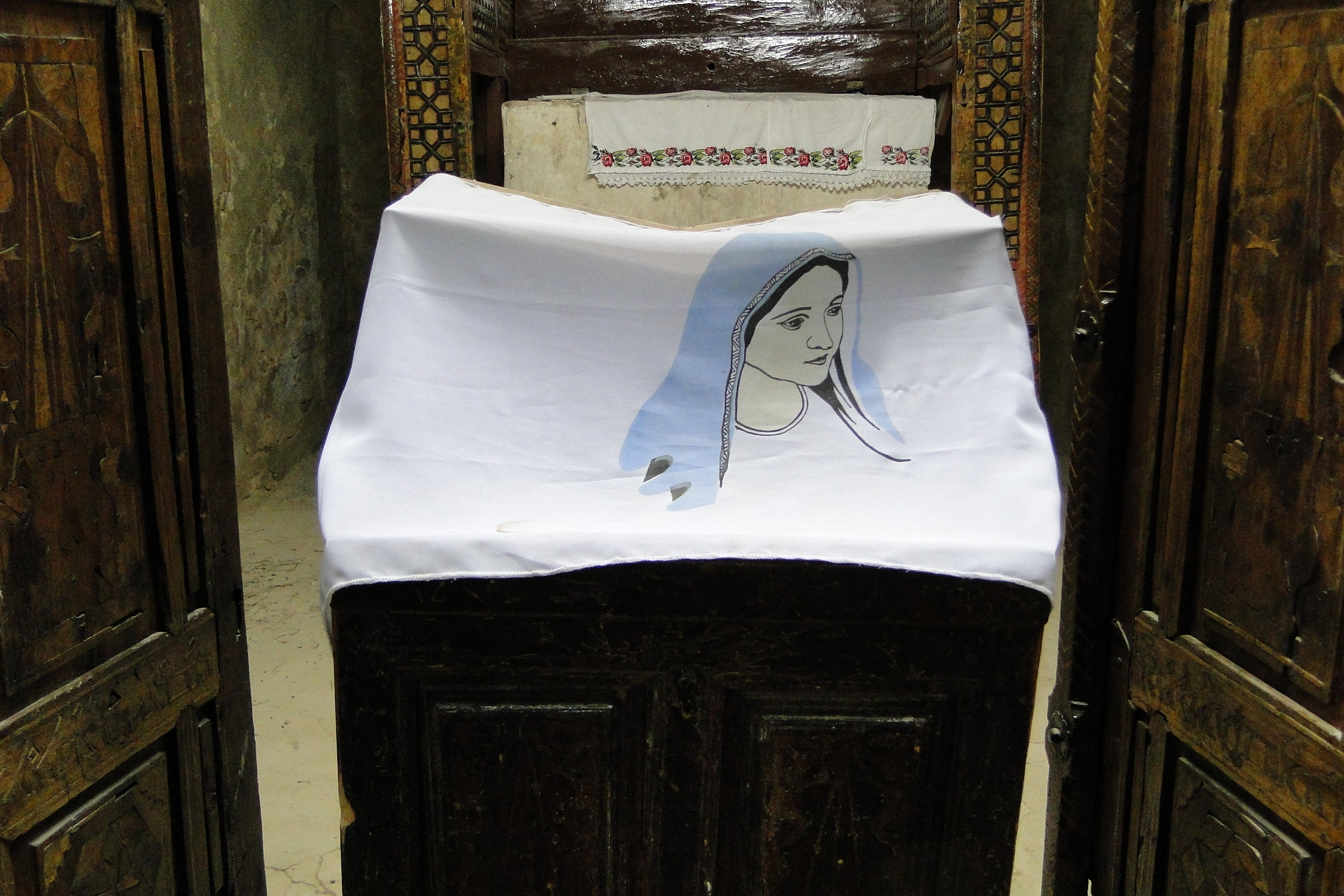
Virgin Mary image in the Sayyida Chapel

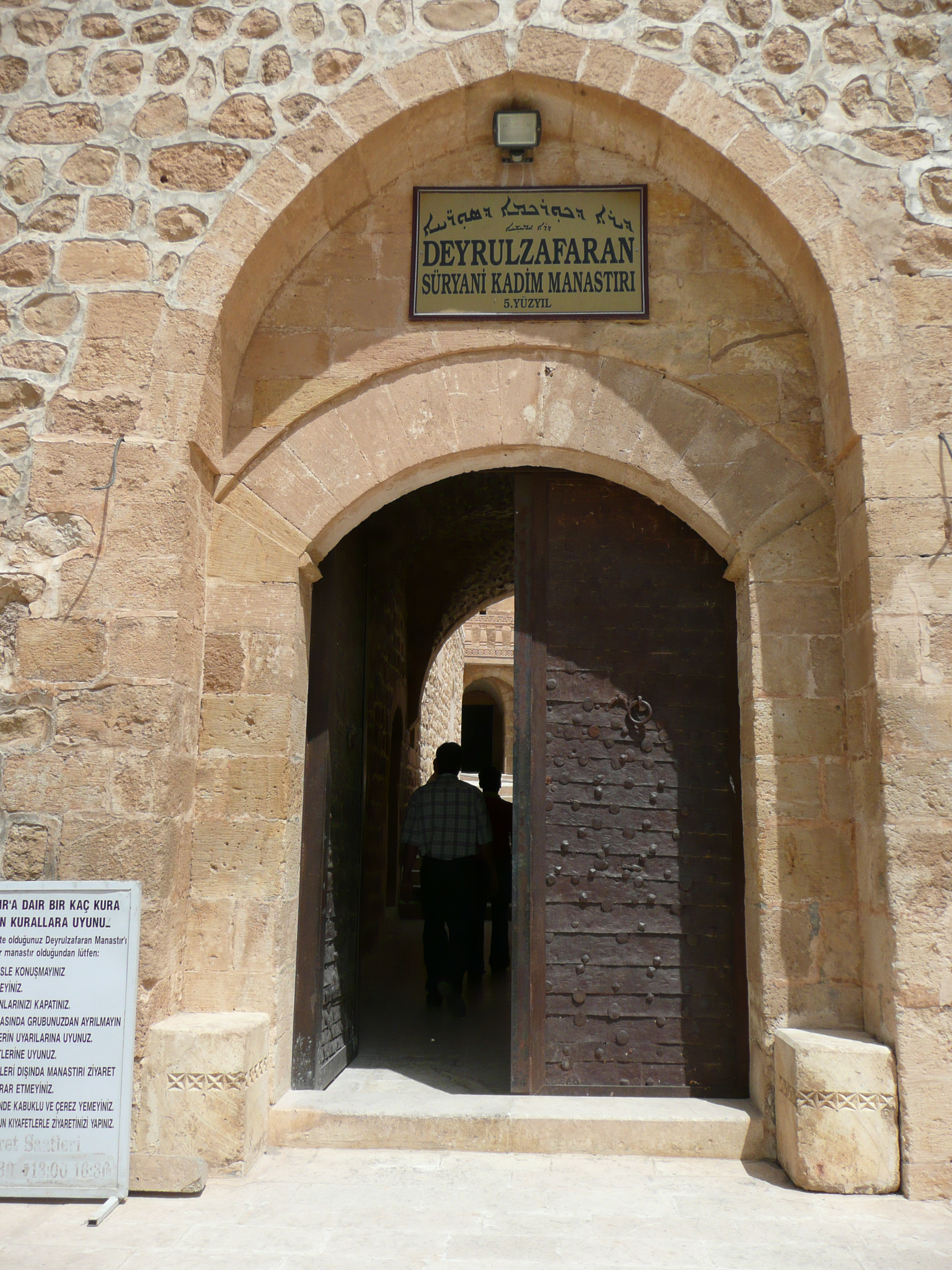
Entrance to one of the churches

== See also ==
- Oldest churches in the world
- Mor Gabriel Monastery
- Mount Izla
- Anti-Assyrian sentiment
- Christology

== Sources ==
- Üngör, Uğur Ümit (2011). The Making of Modern Turkey: Nation and State in Eastern Anatolia, 1913–1950. Oxford University Press. ISBN 978-0-19-965522-9.
- Ignatius Aphram I Barsoum (2008). History of the Za’faraan Monastery. Publications of the Archdiocese of the Syriac Orthodox Church. Translated by Matti Moosa. Piscataway, NJ: Gorgias Press. ISBN 978-1-59333-639-4.
- Dinno, Khalid S. (2017). The Syrian Orthodox Christians in the Late Ottoman Period and Beyond: Crisis, Then Revival. Gorgias Eastern Christian studies. Piscataway (N.J.): Gorgias Press. ISBN 978-1-4632-0575-1.
